

22001–22100 

|-bgcolor=#d6d6d6
| 22001 ||  || — || December 7, 1999 || Socorro || LINEAR || — || align=right | 9.9 km || 
|-id=002 bgcolor=#E9E9E9
| 22002 Richardregan ||  ||  || December 7, 1999 || Socorro || LINEAR || — || align=right | 3.5 km || 
|-id=003 bgcolor=#d6d6d6
| 22003 Startek ||  ||  || December 7, 1999 || Socorro || LINEAR || KOR || align=right | 3.9 km || 
|-id=004 bgcolor=#fefefe
| 22004 ||  || — || December 7, 1999 || Socorro || LINEAR || — || align=right | 4.6 km || 
|-id=005 bgcolor=#d6d6d6
| 22005 Willnelson ||  ||  || December 7, 1999 || Socorro || LINEAR || — || align=right | 7.7 km || 
|-id=006 bgcolor=#d6d6d6
| 22006 ||  || — || December 7, 1999 || Socorro || LINEAR || — || align=right | 10 km || 
|-id=007 bgcolor=#d6d6d6
| 22007 ||  || — || December 7, 1999 || Socorro || LINEAR || EOS || align=right | 5.5 km || 
|-id=008 bgcolor=#C2FFFF
| 22008 ||  || — || December 7, 1999 || Socorro || LINEAR || L4 || align=right | 25 km || 
|-id=009 bgcolor=#C2FFFF
| 22009 ||  || — || December 7, 1999 || Socorro || LINEAR || L4 || align=right | 22 km || 
|-id=010 bgcolor=#C2FFFF
| 22010 Kuzmina ||  ||  || December 7, 1999 || Socorro || LINEAR || L4 || align=right | 19 km || 
|-id=011 bgcolor=#d6d6d6
| 22011 ||  || — || December 7, 1999 || Socorro || LINEAR || TIR || align=right | 9.0 km || 
|-id=012 bgcolor=#C2FFFF
| 22012 ||  || — || December 7, 1999 || Socorro || LINEAR || L4 || align=right | 23 km || 
|-id=013 bgcolor=#E9E9E9
| 22013 ||  || — || December 7, 1999 || Socorro || LINEAR || GEF || align=right | 5.8 km || 
|-id=014 bgcolor=#C2FFFF
| 22014 ||  || — || December 7, 1999 || Socorro || LINEAR || L4 || align=right | 39 km || 
|-id=015 bgcolor=#d6d6d6
| 22015 ||  || — || December 7, 1999 || Socorro || LINEAR || — || align=right | 9.8 km || 
|-id=016 bgcolor=#d6d6d6
| 22016 ||  || — || December 7, 1999 || Socorro || LINEAR || — || align=right | 14 km || 
|-id=017 bgcolor=#d6d6d6
| 22017 ||  || — || December 10, 1999 || Oizumi || T. Kobayashi || EOS || align=right | 8.4 km || 
|-id=018 bgcolor=#d6d6d6
| 22018 ||  || — || December 8, 1999 || Nachi-Katsuura || Y. Shimizu, T. Urata || — || align=right | 12 km || 
|-id=019 bgcolor=#fefefe
| 22019 ||  || — || December 4, 1999 || Catalina || CSS || — || align=right | 3.8 km || 
|-id=020 bgcolor=#d6d6d6
| 22020 ||  || — || December 4, 1999 || Catalina || CSS || THM || align=right | 11 km || 
|-id=021 bgcolor=#d6d6d6
| 22021 ||  || — || December 4, 1999 || Catalina || CSS || THM || align=right | 9.0 km || 
|-id=022 bgcolor=#fefefe
| 22022 Gould ||  ||  || December 5, 1999 || Catalina || CSS || FLO || align=right | 4.6 km || 
|-id=023 bgcolor=#E9E9E9
| 22023 ||  || — || December 11, 1999 || Socorro || LINEAR || — || align=right | 7.6 km || 
|-id=024 bgcolor=#E9E9E9
| 22024 ||  || — || December 11, 1999 || Socorro || LINEAR || — || align=right | 6.0 km || 
|-id=025 bgcolor=#E9E9E9
| 22025 ||  || — || December 5, 1999 || Catalina || CSS || GEF || align=right | 4.3 km || 
|-id=026 bgcolor=#d6d6d6
| 22026 ||  || — || December 5, 1999 || Catalina || CSS || — || align=right | 10 km || 
|-id=027 bgcolor=#fefefe
| 22027 ||  || — || December 5, 1999 || Catalina || CSS || V || align=right | 3.1 km || 
|-id=028 bgcolor=#fefefe
| 22028 ||  || — || December 7, 1999 || Catalina || CSS || FLO || align=right | 2.9 km || 
|-id=029 bgcolor=#E9E9E9
| 22029 ||  || — || December 7, 1999 || Catalina || CSS || NEM || align=right | 5.1 km || 
|-id=030 bgcolor=#fefefe
| 22030 ||  || — || December 7, 1999 || Črni Vrh || Črni Vrh || — || align=right | 4.2 km || 
|-id=031 bgcolor=#d6d6d6
| 22031 ||  || — || December 14, 1999 || Fountain Hills || C. W. Juels || EOS || align=right | 6.6 km || 
|-id=032 bgcolor=#E9E9E9
| 22032 Mikekoop ||  ||  || December 9, 1999 || Anderson Mesa || LONEOS || — || align=right | 3.8 km || 
|-id=033 bgcolor=#E9E9E9
| 22033 ||  || — || December 8, 1999 || Socorro || LINEAR || — || align=right | 4.8 km || 
|-id=034 bgcolor=#E9E9E9
| 22034 ||  || — || December 10, 1999 || Socorro || LINEAR || — || align=right | 5.5 km || 
|-id=035 bgcolor=#C2FFFF
| 22035 ||  || — || December 10, 1999 || Socorro || LINEAR || L4 || align=right | 24 km || 
|-id=036 bgcolor=#d6d6d6
| 22036 ||  || — || December 12, 1999 || Socorro || LINEAR || — || align=right | 11 km || 
|-id=037 bgcolor=#d6d6d6
| 22037 ||  || — || December 12, 1999 || Socorro || LINEAR || — || align=right | 9.5 km || 
|-id=038 bgcolor=#fefefe
| 22038 Margarshain ||  ||  || December 12, 1999 || Socorro || LINEAR || FLO || align=right | 2.1 km || 
|-id=039 bgcolor=#d6d6d6
| 22039 ||  || — || December 12, 1999 || Socorro || LINEAR || EOS || align=right | 5.9 km || 
|-id=040 bgcolor=#d6d6d6
| 22040 ||  || — || December 12, 1999 || Socorro || LINEAR || EOS || align=right | 9.8 km || 
|-id=041 bgcolor=#C2FFFF
| 22041 ||  || — || December 12, 1999 || Socorro || LINEAR || L4 || align=right | 22 km || 
|-id=042 bgcolor=#C2FFFF
| 22042 ||  || — || December 12, 1999 || Socorro || LINEAR || L4 || align=right | 20 km || 
|-id=043 bgcolor=#d6d6d6
| 22043 ||  || — || December 12, 1999 || Socorro || LINEAR || FIR || align=right | 17 km || 
|-id=044 bgcolor=#d6d6d6
| 22044 ||  || — || December 12, 1999 || Socorro || LINEAR || ALA || align=right | 21 km || 
|-id=045 bgcolor=#d6d6d6
| 22045 ||  || — || December 13, 1999 || Socorro || LINEAR || — || align=right | 8.3 km || 
|-id=046 bgcolor=#d6d6d6
| 22046 ||  || — || December 13, 1999 || Socorro || LINEAR || — || align=right | 18 km || 
|-id=047 bgcolor=#E9E9E9
| 22047 ||  || — || December 15, 1999 || Socorro || LINEAR || EUN || align=right | 4.5 km || 
|-id=048 bgcolor=#E9E9E9
| 22048 ||  || — || December 3, 1999 || Socorro || LINEAR || — || align=right | 3.6 km || 
|-id=049 bgcolor=#C2FFFF
| 22049 ||  || — || December 7, 1999 || Socorro || LINEAR || L4 || align=right | 19 km || 
|-id=050 bgcolor=#d6d6d6
| 22050 ||  || — || December 31, 1999 || Višnjan Observatory || K. Korlević || — || align=right | 16 km || 
|-id=051 bgcolor=#d6d6d6
| 22051 ||  || — || January 2, 2000 || Socorro || LINEAR || — || align=right | 12 km || 
|-id=052 bgcolor=#C2FFFF
| 22052 ||  || — || January 3, 2000 || Socorro || LINEAR || L4 || align=right | 28 km || 
|-id=053 bgcolor=#E9E9E9
| 22053 ||  || — || January 3, 2000 || Socorro || LINEAR || ADE || align=right | 11 km || 
|-id=054 bgcolor=#C2FFFF
| 22054 ||  || — || January 3, 2000 || Socorro || LINEAR || L4 || align=right | 34 km || 
|-id=055 bgcolor=#C2FFFF
| 22055 ||  || — || January 3, 2000 || Socorro || LINEAR || L4 || align=right | 32 km || 
|-id=056 bgcolor=#C2FFFF
| 22056 ||  || — || January 3, 2000 || Socorro || LINEAR || L4slow || align=right | 25 km || 
|-id=057 bgcolor=#fefefe
| 22057 Brianking ||  ||  || January 4, 2000 || Socorro || LINEAR || — || align=right | 3.0 km || 
|-id=058 bgcolor=#d6d6d6
| 22058 ||  || — || January 4, 2000 || Socorro || LINEAR || 3:2 || align=right | 17 km || 
|-id=059 bgcolor=#C2FFFF
| 22059 ||  || — || January 5, 2000 || Socorro || LINEAR || L4 || align=right | 25 km || 
|-id=060 bgcolor=#d6d6d6
| 22060 ||  || — || January 5, 2000 || Socorro || LINEAR || EOS || align=right | 8.6 km || 
|-id=061 bgcolor=#d6d6d6
| 22061 ||  || — || January 5, 2000 || Socorro || LINEAR || — || align=right | 5.2 km || 
|-id=062 bgcolor=#d6d6d6
| 22062 ||  || — || January 5, 2000 || Socorro || LINEAR || HYG || align=right | 9.5 km || 
|-id=063 bgcolor=#fefefe
| 22063 Dansealey ||  ||  || January 5, 2000 || Socorro || LINEAR || V || align=right | 2.8 km || 
|-id=064 bgcolor=#E9E9E9
| 22064 Angelalewis ||  ||  || January 5, 2000 || Socorro || LINEAR || — || align=right | 4.6 km || 
|-id=065 bgcolor=#fefefe
| 22065 Colgrove ||  ||  || January 5, 2000 || Socorro || LINEAR || — || align=right | 3.5 km || 
|-id=066 bgcolor=#d6d6d6
| 22066 ||  || — || January 5, 2000 || Socorro || LINEAR || — || align=right | 11 km || 
|-id=067 bgcolor=#E9E9E9
| 22067 ||  || — || January 5, 2000 || Socorro || LINEAR || — || align=right | 5.1 km || 
|-id=068 bgcolor=#d6d6d6
| 22068 ||  || — || January 5, 2000 || Socorro || LINEAR || — || align=right | 14 km || 
|-id=069 bgcolor=#d6d6d6
| 22069 ||  || — || January 5, 2000 || Socorro || LINEAR || EOS || align=right | 9.3 km || 
|-id=070 bgcolor=#d6d6d6
| 22070 ||  || — || January 5, 2000 || Socorro || LINEAR || 3:2 || align=right | 19 km || 
|-id=071 bgcolor=#d6d6d6
| 22071 ||  || — || January 5, 2000 || Socorro || LINEAR || URS || align=right | 18 km || 
|-id=072 bgcolor=#d6d6d6
| 22072 ||  || — || January 5, 2000 || Socorro || LINEAR || EOS || align=right | 7.8 km || 
|-id=073 bgcolor=#d6d6d6
| 22073 ||  || — || January 5, 2000 || Socorro || LINEAR || — || align=right | 11 km || 
|-id=074 bgcolor=#d6d6d6
| 22074 ||  || — || January 5, 2000 || Socorro || LINEAR || EOS || align=right | 12 km || 
|-id=075 bgcolor=#E9E9E9
| 22075 ||  || — || January 5, 2000 || Socorro || LINEAR || — || align=right | 4.4 km || 
|-id=076 bgcolor=#d6d6d6
| 22076 ||  || — || January 5, 2000 || Socorro || LINEAR || NAE || align=right | 9.4 km || 
|-id=077 bgcolor=#E9E9E9
| 22077 ||  || — || January 5, 2000 || Socorro || LINEAR || — || align=right | 3.5 km || 
|-id=078 bgcolor=#E9E9E9
| 22078 ||  || — || January 7, 2000 || Socorro || LINEAR || ADE || align=right | 7.7 km || 
|-id=079 bgcolor=#E9E9E9
| 22079 Kabinoff ||  ||  || January 8, 2000 || Socorro || LINEAR || — || align=right | 3.9 km || 
|-id=080 bgcolor=#fefefe
| 22080 Emilevasseur ||  ||  || January 4, 2000 || Socorro || LINEAR || V || align=right | 3.2 km || 
|-id=081 bgcolor=#E9E9E9
| 22081 ||  || — || January 8, 2000 || Socorro || LINEAR || — || align=right | 5.1 km || 
|-id=082 bgcolor=#E9E9E9
| 22082 Rountree ||  ||  || January 8, 2000 || Socorro || LINEAR || — || align=right | 4.6 km || 
|-id=083 bgcolor=#d6d6d6
| 22083 ||  || — || January 8, 2000 || Socorro || LINEAR || ALA || align=right | 14 km || 
|-id=084 bgcolor=#E9E9E9
| 22084 ||  || — || January 7, 2000 || Socorro || LINEAR || — || align=right | 3.7 km || 
|-id=085 bgcolor=#E9E9E9
| 22085 ||  || — || January 7, 2000 || Socorro || LINEAR || — || align=right | 3.9 km || 
|-id=086 bgcolor=#d6d6d6
| 22086 ||  || — || January 7, 2000 || Socorro || LINEAR || — || align=right | 16 km || 
|-id=087 bgcolor=#d6d6d6
| 22087 ||  || — || January 7, 2000 || Socorro || LINEAR || — || align=right | 13 km || 
|-id=088 bgcolor=#E9E9E9
| 22088 ||  || — || January 8, 2000 || Socorro || LINEAR || EUN || align=right | 5.2 km || 
|-id=089 bgcolor=#E9E9E9
| 22089 ||  || — || January 8, 2000 || Socorro || LINEAR || GEF || align=right | 4.0 km || 
|-id=090 bgcolor=#d6d6d6
| 22090 ||  || — || January 8, 2000 || Socorro || LINEAR || — || align=right | 9.4 km || 
|-id=091 bgcolor=#E9E9E9
| 22091 ||  || — || January 8, 2000 || Socorro || LINEAR || — || align=right | 7.5 km || 
|-id=092 bgcolor=#E9E9E9
| 22092 ||  || — || January 9, 2000 || Socorro || LINEAR || EUN || align=right | 4.9 km || 
|-id=093 bgcolor=#E9E9E9
| 22093 ||  || — || January 9, 2000 || Socorro || LINEAR || GEF || align=right | 3.7 km || 
|-id=094 bgcolor=#d6d6d6
| 22094 ||  || — || January 9, 2000 || Socorro || LINEAR || URS || align=right | 12 km || 
|-id=095 bgcolor=#d6d6d6
| 22095 ||  || — || January 11, 2000 || Socorro || LINEAR || URS || align=right | 16 km || 
|-id=096 bgcolor=#E9E9E9
| 22096 ||  || — || January 3, 2000 || Socorro || LINEAR || — || align=right | 5.8 km || 
|-id=097 bgcolor=#d6d6d6
| 22097 ||  || — || January 21, 2000 || Socorro || LINEAR || — || align=right | 25 km || 
|-id=098 bgcolor=#E9E9E9
| 22098 ||  || — || January 30, 2000 || Socorro || LINEAR || — || align=right | 12 km || 
|-id=099 bgcolor=#FFC2E0
| 22099 ||  || — || March 14, 2000 || Catalina || CSS || APO +1km || align=right data-sort-value="0.52" | 520 m || 
|-id=100 bgcolor=#d6d6d6
| 22100 ||  || — || April 5, 2000 || Socorro || LINEAR || EOSslow || align=right | 7.2 km || 
|}

22101–22200 

|-bgcolor=#d6d6d6
| 22101 ||  || — || May 6, 2000 || Socorro || LINEAR || FIR || align=right | 9.4 km || 
|-id=102 bgcolor=#E9E9E9
| 22102 Karenlamb ||  ||  || May 7, 2000 || Socorro || LINEAR || — || align=right | 4.9 km || 
|-id=103 bgcolor=#fefefe
| 22103 ||  || — || June 7, 2000 || Socorro || LINEAR || — || align=right | 3.7 km || 
|-id=104 bgcolor=#E9E9E9
| 22104 ||  || — || June 8, 2000 || Socorro || LINEAR || — || align=right | 7.5 km || 
|-id=105 bgcolor=#fefefe
| 22105 Pirko ||  ||  || June 11, 2000 || Anderson Mesa || LONEOS || — || align=right | 3.8 km || 
|-id=106 bgcolor=#E9E9E9
| 22106 Tomokoarai ||  ||  || July 5, 2000 || Anderson Mesa || LONEOS || — || align=right | 12 km || 
|-id=107 bgcolor=#fefefe
| 22107 ||  || — || July 31, 2000 || Socorro || LINEAR || — || align=right | 2.6 km || 
|-id=108 bgcolor=#d6d6d6
| 22108 || 2000 PD || — || August 1, 2000 || Črni Vrh || Črni Vrh || SAN || align=right | 10 km || 
|-id=109 bgcolor=#fefefe
| 22109 Loriehutch ||  ||  || August 1, 2000 || Socorro || LINEAR || FLO || align=right | 2.2 km || 
|-id=110 bgcolor=#E9E9E9
| 22110 ||  || — || August 25, 2000 || Socorro || LINEAR || — || align=right | 8.4 km || 
|-id=111 bgcolor=#fefefe
| 22111 ||  || — || August 25, 2000 || Socorro || LINEAR || — || align=right | 4.1 km || 
|-id=112 bgcolor=#fefefe
| 22112 Staceyraw ||  ||  || August 31, 2000 || Socorro || LINEAR || — || align=right | 4.6 km || 
|-id=113 bgcolor=#fefefe
| 22113 ||  || — || September 1, 2000 || Socorro || LINEAR || — || align=right | 4.0 km || 
|-id=114 bgcolor=#fefefe
| 22114 ||  || — || September 5, 2000 || Socorro || LINEAR || — || align=right | 5.3 km || 
|-id=115 bgcolor=#E9E9E9
| 22115 ||  || — || September 1, 2000 || Socorro || LINEAR || ADE || align=right | 11 km || 
|-id=116 bgcolor=#d6d6d6
| 22116 ||  || — || September 2, 2000 || Socorro || LINEAR || 3:2 || align=right | 15 km || 
|-id=117 bgcolor=#E9E9E9
| 22117 ||  || — || September 24, 2000 || Socorro || LINEAR || — || align=right | 3.6 km || 
|-id=118 bgcolor=#d6d6d6
| 22118 ||  || — || September 24, 2000 || Socorro || LINEAR || LIX || align=right | 12 km || 
|-id=119 bgcolor=#E9E9E9
| 22119 ||  || — || September 23, 2000 || Socorro || LINEAR || EUN || align=right | 7.1 km || 
|-id=120 bgcolor=#fefefe
| 22120 Gaylefarrar ||  ||  || September 24, 2000 || Socorro || LINEAR || FLO || align=right | 1.7 km || 
|-id=121 bgcolor=#fefefe
| 22121 ||  || — || September 24, 2000 || Socorro || LINEAR || slow? || align=right | 3.1 km || 
|-id=122 bgcolor=#d6d6d6
| 22122 ||  || — || September 24, 2000 || Socorro || LINEAR || EOS || align=right | 7.0 km || 
|-id=123 bgcolor=#d6d6d6
| 22123 ||  || — || September 27, 2000 || Socorro || LINEAR || EOS || align=right | 14 km || 
|-id=124 bgcolor=#fefefe
| 22124 ||  || — || September 20, 2000 || Haleakala || NEAT || — || align=right | 2.0 km || 
|-id=125 bgcolor=#E9E9E9
| 22125 ||  || — || September 30, 2000 || Socorro || LINEAR || EUN || align=right | 6.0 km || 
|-id=126 bgcolor=#d6d6d6
| 22126 ||  || — || September 21, 2000 || Haleakala || NEAT || EOS || align=right | 6.7 km || 
|-id=127 bgcolor=#E9E9E9
| 22127 ||  || — || September 27, 2000 || Socorro || LINEAR || GEF || align=right | 4.4 km || 
|-id=128 bgcolor=#E9E9E9
| 22128 ||  || — || September 24, 2000 || Socorro || LINEAR || — || align=right | 4.8 km || 
|-id=129 bgcolor=#d6d6d6
| 22129 ||  || — || September 26, 2000 || Socorro || LINEAR || — || align=right | 14 km || 
|-id=130 bgcolor=#fefefe
| 22130 ||  || — || October 31, 2000 || Socorro || LINEAR || — || align=right | 3.3 km || 
|-id=131 bgcolor=#fefefe
| 22131 ||  || — || October 24, 2000 || Socorro || LINEAR || NYS || align=right | 4.7 km || 
|-id=132 bgcolor=#d6d6d6
| 22132 Merkley ||  ||  || October 24, 2000 || Socorro || LINEAR || KOR || align=right | 3.5 km || 
|-id=133 bgcolor=#d6d6d6
| 22133 ||  || — || October 24, 2000 || Socorro || LINEAR || EOS || align=right | 5.7 km || 
|-id=134 bgcolor=#d6d6d6
| 22134 Kirian ||  ||  || October 25, 2000 || Socorro || LINEAR || — || align=right | 6.3 km || 
|-id=135 bgcolor=#E9E9E9
| 22135 ||  || — || October 25, 2000 || Socorro || LINEAR || EUNslow? || align=right | 6.5 km || 
|-id=136 bgcolor=#fefefe
| 22136 Jamesharrison ||  ||  || November 1, 2000 || Desert Beaver || W. K. Y. Yeung || FLO || align=right | 2.7 km || 
|-id=137 bgcolor=#E9E9E9
| 22137 Annettelee ||  ||  || November 1, 2000 || Socorro || LINEAR || — || align=right | 2.8 km || 
|-id=138 bgcolor=#d6d6d6
| 22138 Laynrichards ||  ||  || November 1, 2000 || Socorro || LINEAR || — || align=right | 7.5 km || 
|-id=139 bgcolor=#fefefe
| 22139 Jamescox ||  ||  || November 1, 2000 || Socorro || LINEAR || — || align=right | 3.4 km || 
|-id=140 bgcolor=#E9E9E9
| 22140 Suzyamamoto ||  ||  || November 1, 2000 || Socorro || LINEAR || — || align=right | 3.2 km || 
|-id=141 bgcolor=#E9E9E9
| 22141 ||  || — || November 1, 2000 || Socorro || LINEAR || — || align=right | 4.5 km || 
|-id=142 bgcolor=#fefefe
| 22142 Loripryor ||  ||  || November 1, 2000 || Socorro || LINEAR || FLO || align=right | 2.3 km || 
|-id=143 bgcolor=#fefefe
| 22143 Cathyfowler ||  ||  || November 1, 2000 || Socorro || LINEAR || — || align=right | 2.6 km || 
|-id=144 bgcolor=#fefefe
| 22144 Linmichaels ||  ||  || November 1, 2000 || Socorro || LINEAR || — || align=right | 3.2 km || 
|-id=145 bgcolor=#fefefe
| 22145 ||  || — || November 21, 2000 || Socorro || LINEAR || — || align=right | 3.0 km || 
|-id=146 bgcolor=#E9E9E9
| 22146 Samaan ||  ||  || November 20, 2000 || Socorro || LINEAR || — || align=right | 6.5 km || 
|-id=147 bgcolor=#d6d6d6
| 22147 ||  || — || November 20, 2000 || Socorro || LINEAR || — || align=right | 11 km || 
|-id=148 bgcolor=#E9E9E9
| 22148 Francislee ||  ||  || November 21, 2000 || Socorro || LINEAR || — || align=right | 5.6 km || 
|-id=149 bgcolor=#C2FFFF
| 22149 ||  || — || November 21, 2000 || Socorro || LINEAR || L4 || align=right | 48 km || 
|-id=150 bgcolor=#fefefe
| 22150 ||  || — || November 21, 2000 || Socorro || LINEAR || — || align=right | 7.3 km || 
|-id=151 bgcolor=#d6d6d6
| 22151 Davebracy ||  ||  || November 21, 2000 || Socorro || LINEAR || KOR || align=right | 3.7 km || 
|-id=152 bgcolor=#fefefe
| 22152 Robbennett ||  ||  || November 21, 2000 || Socorro || LINEAR || NYS || align=right | 1.5 km || 
|-id=153 bgcolor=#E9E9E9
| 22153 Kathbarnhart ||  ||  || November 21, 2000 || Socorro || LINEAR || — || align=right | 2.1 km || 
|-id=154 bgcolor=#d6d6d6
| 22154 ||  || — || November 20, 2000 || Socorro || LINEAR || — || align=right | 8.1 km || 
|-id=155 bgcolor=#fefefe
| 22155 Marchetti ||  ||  || November 20, 2000 || Socorro || LINEAR || V || align=right | 2.6 km || 
|-id=156 bgcolor=#fefefe
| 22156 Richoffman ||  ||  || November 21, 2000 || Socorro || LINEAR || — || align=right | 6.4 km || 
|-id=157 bgcolor=#d6d6d6
| 22157 Bryanhoran ||  ||  || November 21, 2000 || Socorro || LINEAR || THM || align=right | 8.5 km || 
|-id=158 bgcolor=#E9E9E9
| 22158 Chee ||  ||  || November 21, 2000 || Socorro || LINEAR || — || align=right | 3.5 km || 
|-id=159 bgcolor=#E9E9E9
| 22159 ||  || — || November 20, 2000 || Socorro || LINEAR || — || align=right | 4.4 km || 
|-id=160 bgcolor=#E9E9E9
| 22160 ||  || — || November 20, 2000 || Socorro || LINEAR || — || align=right | 4.8 km || 
|-id=161 bgcolor=#E9E9E9
| 22161 Santagata ||  ||  || November 29, 2000 || Socorro || LINEAR || HEN || align=right | 3.3 km || 
|-id=162 bgcolor=#E9E9E9
| 22162 Leslijohnson ||  ||  || November 29, 2000 || Socorro || LINEAR || — || align=right | 3.5 km || 
|-id=163 bgcolor=#E9E9E9
| 22163 ||  || — || November 26, 2000 || Socorro || LINEAR || — || align=right | 5.3 km || 
|-id=164 bgcolor=#E9E9E9
| 22164 ||  || — || November 19, 2000 || Socorro || LINEAR || ADE || align=right | 7.6 km || 
|-id=165 bgcolor=#fefefe
| 22165 Kathydouglas ||  ||  || November 20, 2000 || Socorro || LINEAR || — || align=right | 2.0 km || 
|-id=166 bgcolor=#fefefe
| 22166 ||  || — || November 30, 2000 || Socorro || LINEAR || slow || align=right | 4.7 km || 
|-id=167 bgcolor=#fefefe
| 22167 Lane-Cline ||  ||  || November 30, 2000 || Socorro || LINEAR || V || align=right | 1.8 km || 
|-id=168 bgcolor=#FA8072
| 22168 Weissflog ||  ||  || November 30, 2000 || Drebach || J. Kandler, G. Lehmann || — || align=right | 2.1 km || 
|-id=169 bgcolor=#d6d6d6
| 22169 ||  || — || November 23, 2000 || Haleakala || NEAT || — || align=right | 7.7 km || 
|-id=170 bgcolor=#E9E9E9
| 22170 ||  || — || November 26, 2000 || Socorro || LINEAR || EUN || align=right | 5.0 km || 
|-id=171 bgcolor=#E9E9E9
| 22171 Choi ||  ||  || November 26, 2000 || Socorro || LINEAR || — || align=right | 7.5 km || 
|-id=172 bgcolor=#E9E9E9
| 22172 ||  || — || December 4, 2000 || Socorro || LINEAR || MAR || align=right | 4.2 km || 
|-id=173 bgcolor=#E9E9E9
| 22173 Myersdavis ||  ||  || December 4, 2000 || Socorro || LINEAR || — || align=right | 4.7 km || 
|-id=174 bgcolor=#E9E9E9
| 22174 Allisonmae ||  ||  || December 4, 2000 || Socorro || LINEAR || — || align=right | 3.6 km || 
|-id=175 bgcolor=#E9E9E9
| 22175 ||  || — || December 4, 2000 || Socorro || LINEAR || — || align=right | 5.3 km || 
|-id=176 bgcolor=#fefefe
| 22176 ||  || — || December 5, 2000 || Socorro || LINEAR || — || align=right | 6.5 km || 
|-id=177 bgcolor=#d6d6d6
| 22177 Saotome ||  ||  || December 6, 2000 || Bisei SG Center || BATTeRS || ALA || align=right | 22 km || 
|-id=178 bgcolor=#E9E9E9
| 22178 ||  || — || December 5, 2000 || Socorro || LINEAR || — || align=right | 3.0 km || 
|-id=179 bgcolor=#fefefe
| 22179 || 2000 YY || — || December 17, 2000 || Višnjan Observatory || K. Korlević || V || align=right | 2.7 km || 
|-id=180 bgcolor=#C2FFFF
| 22180 || 2000 YZ || — || December 19, 2000 || Anderson Mesa || LONEOS || L5 || align=right | 40 km || 
|-id=181 bgcolor=#E9E9E9
| 22181 ||  || — || December 20, 2000 || Socorro || LINEAR || — || align=right | 3.8 km || 
|-id=182 bgcolor=#fefefe
| 22182 ||  || — || December 22, 2000 || Kitt Peak || Spacewatch || V || align=right | 2.2 km || 
|-id=183 bgcolor=#E9E9E9
| 22183 Canonlau ||  ||  || December 23, 2000 || Desert Beaver || W. K. Y. Yeung || EUN || align=right | 5.3 km || 
|-id=184 bgcolor=#fefefe
| 22184 Rudolfveltman ||  ||  || December 22, 2000 || Anderson Mesa || LONEOS || — || align=right | 3.8 km || 
|-id=185 bgcolor=#d6d6d6
| 22185 Štiavnica ||  ||  || December 29, 2000 || Ondřejov || P. Kušnirák, U. Babiaková || ALA || align=right | 21 km || 
|-id=186 bgcolor=#fefefe
| 22186 ||  || — || December 29, 2000 || Haleakala || NEAT || — || align=right | 3.2 km || 
|-id=187 bgcolor=#d6d6d6
| 22187 ||  || — || December 28, 2000 || Socorro || LINEAR || — || align=right | 12 km || 
|-id=188 bgcolor=#E9E9E9
| 22188 ||  || — || December 30, 2000 || Socorro || LINEAR || — || align=right | 2.8 km || 
|-id=189 bgcolor=#fefefe
| 22189 Gijskatgert || 2049 P-L ||  || September 24, 1960 || Palomar || PLS || — || align=right | 2.3 km || 
|-id=190 bgcolor=#d6d6d6
| 22190 Stellakwee || 2100 P-L ||  || September 24, 1960 || Palomar || PLS || FIR || align=right | 9.9 km || 
|-id=191 bgcolor=#E9E9E9
| 22191 Achúcarro || 2113 P-L ||  || September 24, 1960 || Palomar || PLS || — || align=right | 3.6 km || 
|-id=192 bgcolor=#E9E9E9
| 22192 Vivienreuter || 2571 P-L ||  || September 24, 1960 || Palomar || PLS || — || align=right | 7.4 km || 
|-id=193 bgcolor=#E9E9E9
| 22193 || 2712 P-L || — || September 24, 1960 || Palomar || PLS || — || align=right | 2.7 km || 
|-id=194 bgcolor=#E9E9E9
| 22194 || 2740 P-L || — || September 24, 1960 || Palomar || PLS || — || align=right | 3.3 km || 
|-id=195 bgcolor=#fefefe
| 22195 Nevadodelruiz || 3509 P-L ||  || October 17, 1960 || Palomar || PLS || H || align=right | 3.5 km || 
|-id=196 bgcolor=#d6d6d6
| 22196 || 3518 P-L || — || October 17, 1960 || Palomar || PLS || — || align=right | 5.5 km || 
|-id=197 bgcolor=#fefefe
| 22197 || 3555 P-L || — || October 22, 1960 || Palomar || PLS || V || align=right | 2.7 km || 
|-id=198 bgcolor=#d6d6d6
| 22198 || 4080 P-L || — || September 24, 1960 || Palomar || PLS || — || align=right | 8.9 km || 
|-id=199 bgcolor=#C2FFFF
| 22199 Klonios || 4572 P-L ||  || September 24, 1960 || Palomar || PLS || L4 || align=right | 25 km || 
|-id=200 bgcolor=#d6d6d6
| 22200 || 4573 P-L || — || September 26, 1960 || Palomar || PLS || VER || align=right | 9.0 km || 
|}

22201–22300 

|-bgcolor=#fefefe
| 22201 || 4584 P-L || — || September 24, 1960 || Palomar || PLS || — || align=right | 2.7 km || 
|-id=202 bgcolor=#fefefe
| 22202 || 4715 P-L || — || September 24, 1960 || Palomar || PLS || NYS || align=right | 4.4 km || 
|-id=203 bgcolor=#C2FFFF
| 22203 Prothoenor || 6020 P-L ||  || September 24, 1960 || Palomar || PLS || L4 || align=right | 25 km || 
|-id=204 bgcolor=#d6d6d6
| 22204 || 6121 P-L || — || September 24, 1960 || Palomar || PLS || THM || align=right | 8.6 km || 
|-id=205 bgcolor=#E9E9E9
| 22205 || 6703 P-L || — || September 24, 1960 || Palomar || PLS || — || align=right | 3.9 km || 
|-id=206 bgcolor=#d6d6d6
| 22206 || 6735 P-L || — || September 24, 1960 || Palomar || PLS || HYG || align=right | 6.2 km || 
|-id=207 bgcolor=#fefefe
| 22207 || 7081 P-L || — || October 17, 1960 || Palomar || PLS || FLO || align=right | 1.4 km || 
|-id=208 bgcolor=#d6d6d6
| 22208 || 7605 P-L || — || October 17, 1960 || Palomar || PLS || — || align=right | 5.5 km || 
|-id=209 bgcolor=#E9E9E9
| 22209 || 1056 T-1 || — || March 25, 1971 || Palomar || PLS || ADE || align=right | 7.0 km || 
|-id=210 bgcolor=#fefefe
| 22210 || 2206 T-1 || — || March 25, 1971 || Palomar || PLS || FLO || align=right | 2.1 km || 
|-id=211 bgcolor=#fefefe
| 22211 || 3106 T-1 || — || March 26, 1971 || Palomar || PLS || — || align=right | 3.1 km || 
|-id=212 bgcolor=#fefefe
| 22212 || 3195 T-1 || — || March 26, 1971 || Palomar || PLS || FLO || align=right | 2.6 km || 
|-id=213 bgcolor=#fefefe
| 22213 || 4322 T-1 || — || March 26, 1971 || Palomar || PLS || NYS || align=right | 1.8 km || 
|-id=214 bgcolor=#d6d6d6
| 22214 || 4326 T-1 || — || March 26, 1971 || Palomar || PLS || EOS || align=right | 6.5 km || 
|-id=215 bgcolor=#fefefe
| 22215 || 1108 T-2 || — || September 29, 1973 || Palomar || PLS || V || align=right | 2.4 km || 
|-id=216 bgcolor=#E9E9E9
| 22216 || 1242 T-2 || — || September 29, 1973 || Palomar || PLS || JUN || align=right | 5.9 km || 
|-id=217 bgcolor=#E9E9E9
| 22217 || 1260 T-2 || — || September 29, 1973 || Palomar || PLS || — || align=right | 4.3 km || 
|-id=218 bgcolor=#E9E9E9
| 22218 || 2064 T-2 || — || September 29, 1973 || Palomar || PLS || WIT || align=right | 2.3 km || 
|-id=219 bgcolor=#d6d6d6
| 22219 || 2066 T-2 || — || September 29, 1973 || Palomar || PLS || — || align=right | 7.8 km || 
|-id=220 bgcolor=#fefefe
| 22220 || 2097 T-2 || — || September 29, 1973 || Palomar || PLS || V || align=right | 2.0 km || 
|-id=221 bgcolor=#fefefe
| 22221 || 2243 T-2 || — || September 29, 1973 || Palomar || PLS || NYS || align=right | 2.6 km || 
|-id=222 bgcolor=#C2FFFF
| 22222 Hodios || 3156 T-2 ||  || September 30, 1973 || Palomar || PLS || L4 || align=right | 18 km || 
|-id=223 bgcolor=#fefefe
| 22223 || 3232 T-2 || — || September 30, 1973 || Palomar || PLS || FLO || align=right | 2.8 km || 
|-id=224 bgcolor=#fefefe
| 22224 || 3270 T-2 || — || September 30, 1973 || Palomar || PLS || NYS || align=right | 3.2 km || 
|-id=225 bgcolor=#E9E9E9
| 22225 || 4091 T-2 || — || September 29, 1973 || Palomar || PLS || MIS || align=right | 6.5 km || 
|-id=226 bgcolor=#fefefe
| 22226 || 4328 T-2 || — || September 29, 1973 || Palomar || PLS || — || align=right | 2.5 km || 
|-id=227 bgcolor=#C2FFFF
| 22227 Polyxenos || 5030 T-2 ||  || September 25, 1973 || Palomar || PLS || L4 || align=right | 22 km || 
|-id=228 bgcolor=#E9E9E9
| 22228 || 5081 T-2 || — || September 25, 1973 || Palomar || PLS || MAR || align=right | 3.2 km || 
|-id=229 bgcolor=#fefefe
| 22229 || 5415 T-2 || — || September 25, 1973 || Palomar || PLS || — || align=right | 2.2 km || 
|-id=230 bgcolor=#d6d6d6
| 22230 || 1022 T-3 || — || October 17, 1977 || Palomar || PLS || — || align=right | 6.7 km || 
|-id=231 bgcolor=#E9E9E9
| 22231 || 2239 T-3 || — || October 16, 1977 || Palomar || PLS || — || align=right | 3.1 km || 
|-id=232 bgcolor=#d6d6d6
| 22232 || 2311 T-3 || — || October 16, 1977 || Palomar || PLS || EOS || align=right | 6.2 km || 
|-id=233 bgcolor=#fefefe
| 22233 || 3093 T-3 || — || October 16, 1977 || Palomar || PLS || V || align=right | 2.2 km || 
|-id=234 bgcolor=#fefefe
| 22234 || 3166 T-3 || — || October 16, 1977 || Palomar || PLS || — || align=right | 2.3 km || 
|-id=235 bgcolor=#fefefe
| 22235 || 3502 T-3 || — || October 16, 1977 || Palomar || PLS || — || align=right | 1.7 km || 
|-id=236 bgcolor=#fefefe
| 22236 || 3535 T-3 || — || October 16, 1977 || Palomar || PLS || NYS || align=right | 2.7 km || 
|-id=237 bgcolor=#E9E9E9
| 22237 || 3833 T-3 || — || October 16, 1977 || Palomar || PLS || AST || align=right | 4.2 km || 
|-id=238 bgcolor=#d6d6d6
| 22238 || 3854 T-3 || — || October 16, 1977 || Palomar || PLS || THM || align=right | 7.5 km || 
|-id=239 bgcolor=#E9E9E9
| 22239 || 4030 T-3 || — || October 16, 1977 || Palomar || PLS || — || align=right | 4.3 km || 
|-id=240 bgcolor=#fefefe
| 22240 || 4039 T-3 || — || October 16, 1977 || Palomar || PLS || — || align=right | 3.5 km || 
|-id=241 bgcolor=#d6d6d6
| 22241 || 4072 T-3 || — || October 16, 1977 || Palomar || PLS || HYG || align=right | 10 km || 
|-id=242 bgcolor=#d6d6d6
| 22242 || 4080 T-3 || — || October 16, 1977 || Palomar || PLS || — || align=right | 9.2 km || 
|-id=243 bgcolor=#d6d6d6
| 22243 || 4141 T-3 || — || October 16, 1977 || Palomar || PLS || HYG || align=right | 6.5 km || 
|-id=244 bgcolor=#fefefe
| 22244 || 4235 T-3 || — || October 16, 1977 || Palomar || PLS || — || align=right | 4.2 km || 
|-id=245 bgcolor=#E9E9E9
| 22245 || 4309 T-3 || — || October 16, 1977 || Palomar || PLS || MRX || align=right | 3.6 km || 
|-id=246 bgcolor=#E9E9E9
| 22246 || 4380 T-3 || — || October 16, 1977 || Palomar || PLS || — || align=right | 3.1 km || 
|-id=247 bgcolor=#d6d6d6
| 22247 || 4611 T-3 || — || October 16, 1977 || Palomar || PLS || — || align=right | 8.2 km || 
|-id=248 bgcolor=#d6d6d6
| 22248 || 5029 T-3 || — || October 16, 1977 || Palomar || PLS || — || align=right | 9.6 km || 
|-id=249 bgcolor=#fefefe
| 22249 Dvorets Pionerov ||  ||  || September 11, 1972 || Nauchnij || N. S. Chernykh || — || align=right | 5.5 km || 
|-id=250 bgcolor=#E9E9E9
| 22250 Konstfrolov ||  ||  || September 7, 1978 || Nauchnij || T. M. Smirnova || — || align=right | 3.6 km || 
|-id=251 bgcolor=#fefefe
| 22251 ||  || — || September 2, 1978 || La Silla || C.-I. Lagerkvist || FLO || align=right | 1.9 km || 
|-id=252 bgcolor=#fefefe
| 22252 || 1978 SG || — || September 27, 1978 || La Silla || R. M. West || — || align=right | 2.3 km || 
|-id=253 bgcolor=#E9E9E9
| 22253 Sivers ||  ||  || September 26, 1978 || Nauchnij || L. V. Zhuravleva || — || align=right | 5.4 km || 
|-id=254 bgcolor=#fefefe
| 22254 Vladbarmin ||  ||  || October 3, 1978 || Nauchnij || N. S. Chernykh || — || align=right | 2.7 km || 
|-id=255 bgcolor=#fefefe
| 22255 ||  || — || November 7, 1978 || Palomar || E. F. Helin, S. J. Bus || — || align=right | 2.6 km || 
|-id=256 bgcolor=#fefefe
| 22256 ||  || — || November 7, 1978 || Palomar || E. F. Helin, S. J. Bus || V || align=right | 1.9 km || 
|-id=257 bgcolor=#E9E9E9
| 22257 ||  || — || November 7, 1978 || Palomar || E. F. Helin, S. J. Bus || VIB || align=right | 5.8 km || 
|-id=258 bgcolor=#E9E9E9
| 22258 ||  || — || June 25, 1979 || Siding Spring || E. F. Helin, S. J. Bus || — || align=right | 4.5 km || 
|-id=259 bgcolor=#E9E9E9
| 22259 ||  || — || June 25, 1979 || Siding Spring || E. F. Helin, S. J. Bus || GEF || align=right | 3.7 km || 
|-id=260 bgcolor=#E9E9E9
| 22260 Ur || 1979 UR ||  || October 19, 1979 || Kleť || A. Mrkos || — || align=right | 9.7 km || 
|-id=261 bgcolor=#E9E9E9
| 22261 || 1980 AB || — || January 13, 1980 || Kleť || Z. Vávrová || — || align=right | 5.3 km || 
|-id=262 bgcolor=#fefefe
| 22262 ||  || — || August 4, 1980 || Siding Spring || Edinburgh Obs. || PHO || align=right | 7.3 km || 
|-id=263 bgcolor=#fefefe
| 22263 Pignedoli || 1980 RC ||  || September 3, 1980 || Bologna || San Vittore Obs. || — || align=right | 5.8 km || 
|-id=264 bgcolor=#E9E9E9
| 22264 ||  || — || March 1, 1981 || Siding Spring || S. J. Bus || — || align=right | 3.8 km || 
|-id=265 bgcolor=#fefefe
| 22265 ||  || — || March 1, 1981 || Siding Spring || S. J. Bus || — || align=right | 2.4 km || 
|-id=266 bgcolor=#fefefe
| 22266 ||  || — || March 7, 1981 || Siding Spring || S. J. Bus || — || align=right | 2.3 km || 
|-id=267 bgcolor=#fefefe
| 22267 ||  || — || March 3, 1981 || Siding Spring || S. J. Bus || FLO || align=right | 3.4 km || 
|-id=268 bgcolor=#fefefe
| 22268 ||  || — || March 2, 1981 || Siding Spring || S. J. Bus || — || align=right | 3.0 km || 
|-id=269 bgcolor=#fefefe
| 22269 ||  || — || March 2, 1981 || Siding Spring || S. J. Bus || — || align=right | 3.4 km || 
|-id=270 bgcolor=#E9E9E9
| 22270 ||  || — || March 2, 1981 || Siding Spring || S. J. Bus || MIT || align=right | 8.0 km || 
|-id=271 bgcolor=#d6d6d6
| 22271 ||  || — || March 1, 1981 || Siding Spring || S. J. Bus || — || align=right | 6.2 km || 
|-id=272 bgcolor=#fefefe
| 22272 ||  || — || March 2, 1981 || Siding Spring || S. J. Bus || — || align=right | 1.5 km || 
|-id=273 bgcolor=#fefefe
| 22273 ||  || — || August 26, 1981 || La Silla || H. Debehogne || — || align=right | 2.2 km || 
|-id=274 bgcolor=#fefefe
| 22274 || 1981 RN || — || September 7, 1981 || Kleť || A. Mrkos || V || align=right | 3.9 km || 
|-id=275 bgcolor=#fefefe
| 22275 Barentsen || 1982 BU ||  || January 18, 1982 || Anderson Mesa || E. Bowell || — || align=right | 6.1 km || 
|-id=276 bgcolor=#E9E9E9
| 22276 Belkin ||  ||  || October 21, 1982 || Nauchnij || L. V. Zhuravleva || — || align=right | 5.4 km || 
|-id=277 bgcolor=#E9E9E9
| 22277 Hirado ||  ||  || November 14, 1982 || Kiso || H. Kosai, K. Furukawa || — || align=right | 4.1 km || 
|-id=278 bgcolor=#E9E9E9
| 22278 Protitch ||  ||  || September 2, 1983 || La Silla || H. Debehogne || EUN || align=right | 4.9 km || 
|-id=279 bgcolor=#d6d6d6
| 22279 || 1984 DM || — || February 23, 1984 || La Silla || H. Debehogne || — || align=right | 24 km || 
|-id=280 bgcolor=#d6d6d6
| 22280 Mandragora ||  ||  || February 12, 1985 || La Silla || H. Debehogne || — || align=right | 9.9 km || 
|-id=281 bgcolor=#fefefe
| 22281 Popescu || 1985 PC ||  || August 14, 1985 || Anderson Mesa || E. Bowell || — || align=right | 3.5 km || 
|-id=282 bgcolor=#E9E9E9
| 22282 || 1985 RA || — || September 11, 1985 || Brorfelde || Copenhagen Obs. || GEF || align=right | 5.9 km || 
|-id=283 bgcolor=#FA8072
| 22283 Pytheas || 1986 PY ||  || August 6, 1986 || Smolyan || E. W. Elst, V. G. Ivanova || — || align=right | 3.1 km || 
|-id=284 bgcolor=#E9E9E9
| 22284 || 1986 SH || — || September 30, 1986 || Kleť || A. Mrkos || — || align=right | 3.8 km || 
|-id=285 bgcolor=#d6d6d6
| 22285 || 1987 RR || — || September 3, 1987 || La Silla || E. W. Elst || — || align=right | 15 km || 
|-id=286 bgcolor=#E9E9E9
| 22286 ||  || — || January 18, 1988 || La Silla || H. Debehogne || KON || align=right | 8.4 km || 
|-id=287 bgcolor=#d6d6d6
| 22287 ||  || — || September 14, 1988 || Cerro Tololo || S. J. Bus || THM || align=right | 6.2 km || 
|-id=288 bgcolor=#d6d6d6
| 22288 ||  || — || October 11, 1988 || Kleť || A. Mrkos || — || align=right | 8.2 km || 
|-id=289 bgcolor=#d6d6d6
| 22289 ||  || — || December 11, 1988 || Kushiro || S. Ueda, H. Kaneda || — || align=right | 17 km || 
|-id=290 bgcolor=#fefefe
| 22290 || 1989 AO || — || January 2, 1989 || Palomar || E. F. Helin || — || align=right | 4.8 km || 
|-id=291 bgcolor=#d6d6d6
| 22291 Heitifer ||  ||  || February 2, 1989 || Tautenburg Observatory || F. Börngen || URS || align=right | 14 km || 
|-id=292 bgcolor=#d6d6d6
| 22292 Mosul ||  ||  || September 26, 1989 || La Silla || E. W. Elst || — || align=right | 4.4 km || 
|-id=293 bgcolor=#fefefe
| 22293 ||  || — || September 26, 1989 || La Silla || E. W. Elst || FLO || align=right | 2.4 km || 
|-id=294 bgcolor=#fefefe
| 22294 Simmons ||  ||  || September 28, 1989 || Palomar || C. S. Shoemaker, E. M. Shoemaker || — || align=right | 2.9 km || 
|-id=295 bgcolor=#fefefe
| 22295 ||  || — || September 26, 1989 || La Silla || H. Debehogne || — || align=right | 7.1 km || 
|-id=296 bgcolor=#fefefe
| 22296 ||  || — || October 7, 1989 || La Silla || E. W. Elst || FLO || align=right | 1.9 km || 
|-id=297 bgcolor=#fefefe
| 22297 ||  || — || November 21, 1989 || Kani || Y. Mizuno, T. Furuta || — || align=right | 4.5 km || 
|-id=298 bgcolor=#d6d6d6
| 22298 || 1990 EJ || — || March 2, 1990 || Kushiro || S. Ueda, H. Kaneda || — || align=right | 16 km || 
|-id=299 bgcolor=#E9E9E9
| 22299 Georgesteiner || 1990 GS ||  || April 15, 1990 || La Silla || E. W. Elst || — || align=right | 7.1 km || 
|-id=300 bgcolor=#E9E9E9
| 22300 || 1990 OY || — || July 19, 1990 || Palomar || E. F. Helin || EUN || align=right | 4.4 km || 
|}

22301–22400 

|-bgcolor=#fefefe
| 22301 ||  || — || July 22, 1990 || Palomar || E. F. Helin || — || align=right | 3.5 km || 
|-id=302 bgcolor=#E9E9E9
| 22302 ||  || — || July 24, 1990 || Palomar || H. E. Holt || JUN || align=right | 9.7 km || 
|-id=303 bgcolor=#E9E9E9
| 22303 ||  || — || August 23, 1990 || Palomar || H. E. Holt || MIT || align=right | 8.0 km || 
|-id=304 bgcolor=#E9E9E9
| 22304 ||  || — || September 14, 1990 || Palomar || H. E. Holt || — || align=right | 4.3 km || 
|-id=305 bgcolor=#fefefe
| 22305 ||  || — || September 17, 1990 || Palomar || H. E. Holt || — || align=right | 2.9 km || 
|-id=306 bgcolor=#E9E9E9
| 22306 ||  || — || September 23, 1990 || Palomar || K. J. Lawrence || — || align=right | 3.3 km || 
|-id=307 bgcolor=#fefefe
| 22307 ||  || — || September 16, 1990 || Kleť || A. Mrkos || — || align=right | 6.7 km || 
|-id=308 bgcolor=#E9E9E9
| 22308 ||  || — || October 16, 1990 || La Silla || E. W. Elst || — || align=right | 5.8 km || 
|-id=309 bgcolor=#E9E9E9
| 22309 ||  || — || November 15, 1990 || La Silla || E. W. Elst || — || align=right | 4.9 km || 
|-id=310 bgcolor=#E9E9E9
| 22310 ||  || — || November 18, 1990 || La Silla || E. W. Elst || DOR || align=right | 6.8 km || 
|-id=311 bgcolor=#fefefe
| 22311 ||  || — || March 10, 1991 || La Silla || H. Debehogne || — || align=right | 3.6 km || 
|-id=312 bgcolor=#fefefe
| 22312 Kelly ||  ||  || April 14, 1991 || Palomar || C. S. Shoemaker, D. H. Levy || PHO || align=right | 2.7 km || 
|-id=313 bgcolor=#d6d6d6
| 22313 ||  || — || April 8, 1991 || La Silla || E. W. Elst || — || align=right | 9.6 km || 
|-id=314 bgcolor=#fefefe
| 22314 ||  || — || April 8, 1991 || La Silla || E. W. Elst || FLO || align=right | 2.7 km || 
|-id=315 bgcolor=#fefefe
| 22315 ||  || — || April 8, 1991 || La Silla || E. W. Elst || — || align=right | 2.0 km || 
|-id=316 bgcolor=#fefefe
| 22316 ||  || — || June 6, 1991 || La Silla || E. W. Elst || — || align=right | 2.5 km || 
|-id=317 bgcolor=#d6d6d6
| 22317 ||  || — || June 6, 1991 || La Silla || E. W. Elst || — || align=right | 9.5 km || 
|-id=318 bgcolor=#fefefe
| 22318 ||  || — || August 15, 1991 || Palomar || E. F. Helin || — || align=right | 5.0 km || 
|-id=319 bgcolor=#fefefe
| 22319 ||  || — || August 6, 1991 || La Silla || E. W. Elst || MAS || align=right | 2.4 km || 
|-id=320 bgcolor=#fefefe
| 22320 ||  || — || August 8, 1991 || Palomar || H. E. Holt || — || align=right | 6.0 km || 
|-id=321 bgcolor=#fefefe
| 22321 || 1991 RP || — || September 4, 1991 || Palomar || E. F. Helin || — || align=right | 3.6 km || 
|-id=322 bgcolor=#fefefe
| 22322 Bodensee ||  ||  || September 13, 1991 || Tautenburg Observatory || F. Börngen, L. D. Schmadel || — || align=right | 3.5 km || 
|-id=323 bgcolor=#E9E9E9
| 22323 ||  || — || September 13, 1991 || Palomar || H. E. Holt || EUN || align=right | 3.5 km || 
|-id=324 bgcolor=#fefefe
| 22324 ||  || — || September 10, 1991 || Palomar || H. E. Holt || NYS || align=right | 3.7 km || 
|-id=325 bgcolor=#fefefe
| 22325 ||  || — || September 14, 1991 || Palomar || H. E. Holt || V || align=right | 3.1 km || 
|-id=326 bgcolor=#fefefe
| 22326 || 1991 SZ || — || September 30, 1991 || Siding Spring || R. H. McNaught || V || align=right | 3.3 km || 
|-id=327 bgcolor=#fefefe
| 22327 || 1991 TS || — || October 1, 1991 || Siding Spring || R. H. McNaught || — || align=right | 3.6 km || 
|-id=328 bgcolor=#E9E9E9
| 22328 ||  || — || November 4, 1991 || Kiyosato || S. Otomo || — || align=right | 3.0 km || 
|-id=329 bgcolor=#E9E9E9
| 22329 ||  || — || November 2, 1991 || La Silla || E. W. Elst || — || align=right | 3.1 km || 
|-id=330 bgcolor=#E9E9E9
| 22330 ||  || — || November 2, 1991 || La Silla || E. W. Elst || — || align=right | 4.0 km || 
|-id=331 bgcolor=#E9E9E9
| 22331 ||  || — || January 10, 1992 || Dynic || A. Sugie || — || align=right | 7.0 km || 
|-id=332 bgcolor=#E9E9E9
| 22332 ||  || — || February 29, 1992 || La Silla || UESAC || — || align=right | 4.5 km || 
|-id=333 bgcolor=#fefefe
| 22333 ||  || — || February 29, 1992 || La Silla || UESAC || — || align=right | 2.1 km || 
|-id=334 bgcolor=#E9E9E9
| 22334 ||  || — || March 1, 1992 || La Silla || UESAC || — || align=right | 4.7 km || 
|-id=335 bgcolor=#E9E9E9
| 22335 ||  || — || March 3, 1992 || La Silla || UESAC || — || align=right | 8.6 km || 
|-id=336 bgcolor=#E9E9E9
| 22336 ||  || — || March 1, 1992 || La Silla || UESAC || HOF || align=right | 6.2 km || 
|-id=337 bgcolor=#E9E9E9
| 22337 ||  || — || March 2, 1992 || La Silla || UESAC || — || align=right | 3.2 km || 
|-id=338 bgcolor=#d6d6d6
| 22338 Janemojo || 1992 LE ||  || June 3, 1992 || Palomar || C. S. Shoemaker, D. H. Levy || — || align=right | 8.2 km || 
|-id=339 bgcolor=#d6d6d6
| 22339 ||  || — || July 26, 1992 || La Silla || E. W. Elst || — || align=right | 8.2 km || 
|-id=340 bgcolor=#fefefe
| 22340 ||  || — || July 30, 1992 || La Silla || E. W. Elst || — || align=right | 2.0 km || 
|-id=341 bgcolor=#fefefe
| 22341 Francispoulenc || 1992 PF ||  || August 8, 1992 || Caussols || E. W. Elst || — || align=right | 2.9 km || 
|-id=342 bgcolor=#fefefe
| 22342 ||  || — || September 2, 1992 || La Silla || E. W. Elst || V || align=right | 2.0 km || 
|-id=343 bgcolor=#fefefe
| 22343 ||  || — || September 2, 1992 || La Silla || E. W. Elst || NYS || align=right | 2.1 km || 
|-id=344 bgcolor=#d6d6d6
| 22344 ||  || — || September 2, 1992 || La Silla || E. W. Elst || HYG || align=right | 8.3 km || 
|-id=345 bgcolor=#E9E9E9
| 22345 ||  || — || September 23, 1992 || Palomar || E. F. Helin || — || align=right | 5.8 km || 
|-id=346 bgcolor=#fefefe
| 22346 Katsumatatakashi ||  ||  || September 28, 1992 || Kitami || M. Yanai, K. Watanabe || — || align=right | 3.9 km || 
|-id=347 bgcolor=#fefefe
| 22347 Mishinatakashi ||  ||  || September 30, 1992 || Kitami || K. Endate, K. Watanabe || NYS || align=right | 3.5 km || 
|-id=348 bgcolor=#fefefe
| 22348 Schmeidler ||  ||  || September 24, 1992 || Tautenburg Observatory || L. D. Schmadel, F. Börngen || — || align=right | 2.6 km || 
|-id=349 bgcolor=#fefefe
| 22349 || 1992 UH || — || October 19, 1992 || Kushiro || S. Ueda, H. Kaneda || — || align=right | 3.2 km || 
|-id=350 bgcolor=#fefefe
| 22350 || 1992 US || — || October 21, 1992 || Dynic || A. Sugie || — || align=right | 7.6 km || 
|-id=351 bgcolor=#fefefe
| 22351 Yamashitatoshiki ||  ||  || October 19, 1992 || Kitami || K. Endate, K. Watanabe || FLO || align=right | 3.9 km || 
|-id=352 bgcolor=#fefefe
| 22352 Fujiwarakenjiro ||  ||  || October 26, 1992 || Kitami || K. Endate, K. Watanabe || — || align=right | 5.7 km || 
|-id=353 bgcolor=#fefefe
| 22353 ||  || — || October 28, 1992 || Kushiro || S. Ueda, H. Kaneda || — || align=right | 4.0 km || 
|-id=354 bgcolor=#fefefe
| 22354 Sposetti ||  ||  || October 31, 1992 || Tautenburg Observatory || F. Börngen || — || align=right | 4.8 km || 
|-id=355 bgcolor=#fefefe
| 22355 Yahabananshozan ||  ||  || November 16, 1992 || Kitami || K. Endate, K. Watanabe || NYS || align=right | 2.2 km || 
|-id=356 bgcolor=#fefefe
| 22356 Feyerabend ||  ||  || November 19, 1992 || Kitt Peak || Spacewatch || — || align=right | 2.5 km || 
|-id=357 bgcolor=#E9E9E9
| 22357 || 1992 YJ || — || December 22, 1992 || Yakiimo || A. Natori, T. Urata || slow || align=right | 8.5 km || 
|-id=358 bgcolor=#E9E9E9
| 22358 ||  || — || March 17, 1993 || La Silla || UESAC || — || align=right | 2.6 km || 
|-id=359 bgcolor=#E9E9E9
| 22359 ||  || — || March 17, 1993 || La Silla || UESAC || EUN || align=right | 3.4 km || 
|-id=360 bgcolor=#E9E9E9
| 22360 ||  || — || March 17, 1993 || La Silla || UESAC || EUN || align=right | 4.5 km || 
|-id=361 bgcolor=#fefefe
| 22361 ||  || — || March 17, 1993 || La Silla || UESAC || — || align=right | 2.5 km || 
|-id=362 bgcolor=#E9E9E9
| 22362 ||  || — || March 17, 1993 || La Silla || UESAC || — || align=right | 2.8 km || 
|-id=363 bgcolor=#E9E9E9
| 22363 ||  || — || March 21, 1993 || La Silla || UESAC || — || align=right | 2.9 km || 
|-id=364 bgcolor=#E9E9E9
| 22364 ||  || — || March 19, 1993 || La Silla || UESAC || — || align=right | 3.4 km || 
|-id=365 bgcolor=#E9E9E9
| 22365 ||  || — || March 19, 1993 || La Silla || UESAC || — || align=right | 2.5 km || 
|-id=366 bgcolor=#d6d6d6
| 22366 Flettner || 1993 MT ||  || June 21, 1993 || Kitt Peak || Spacewatch || KOR || align=right | 3.5 km || 
|-id=367 bgcolor=#E9E9E9
| 22367 || 1993 MZ || — || June 18, 1993 || Siding Spring || R. H. McNaught || EUN || align=right | 4.9 km || 
|-id=368 bgcolor=#d6d6d6
| 22368 ||  || — || August 14, 1993 || Caussols || E. W. Elst || EOS || align=right | 6.6 km || 
|-id=369 bgcolor=#fefefe
| 22369 Klinger ||  ||  || September 18, 1993 || Tautenburg Observatory || F. Börngen, L. D. Schmadel || — || align=right | 2.2 km || 
|-id=370 bgcolor=#d6d6d6
| 22370 Italocalvino ||  ||  || October 15, 1993 || Bassano Bresciano || Bassano Bresciano Obs. || — || align=right | 8.5 km || 
|-id=371 bgcolor=#d6d6d6
| 22371 ||  || — || October 9, 1993 || La Silla || E. W. Elst || — || align=right | 7.8 km || 
|-id=372 bgcolor=#d6d6d6
| 22372 ||  || — || October 9, 1993 || La Silla || E. W. Elst || — || align=right | 8.4 km || 
|-id=373 bgcolor=#d6d6d6
| 22373 ||  || — || October 9, 1993 || La Silla || E. W. Elst || — || align=right | 9.4 km || 
|-id=374 bgcolor=#d6d6d6
| 22374 ||  || — || October 9, 1993 || La Silla || E. W. Elst || — || align=right | 8.7 km || 
|-id=375 bgcolor=#fefefe
| 22375 ||  || — || October 9, 1993 || La Silla || E. W. Elst || — || align=right | 2.2 km || 
|-id=376 bgcolor=#d6d6d6
| 22376 ||  || — || October 9, 1993 || La Silla || E. W. Elst || — || align=right | 8.1 km || 
|-id=377 bgcolor=#d6d6d6
| 22377 ||  || — || October 20, 1993 || La Silla || E. W. Elst || — || align=right | 9.8 km || 
|-id=378 bgcolor=#fefefe
| 22378 Gaherty ||  ||  || January 8, 1994 || Kitt Peak || Spacewatch || — || align=right | 4.8 km || 
|-id=379 bgcolor=#fefefe
| 22379 Montale ||  ||  || February 10, 1994 || Farra d'Isonzo || Farra d'Isonzo || FLO || align=right | 2.0 km || 
|-id=380 bgcolor=#fefefe
| 22380 ||  || — || February 7, 1994 || La Silla || E. W. Elst || — || align=right | 2.9 km || 
|-id=381 bgcolor=#fefefe
| 22381 ||  || — || February 7, 1994 || La Silla || E. W. Elst || — || align=right | 2.7 km || 
|-id=382 bgcolor=#fefefe
| 22382 ||  || — || February 8, 1994 || La Silla || E. W. Elst || NYS || align=right | 1.9 km || 
|-id=383 bgcolor=#fefefe
| 22383 Nikolauspacassi || 1994 EL ||  || March 5, 1994 || Farra d'Isonzo || Farra d'Isonzo || — || align=right | 1.9 km || 
|-id=384 bgcolor=#fefefe
| 22384 ||  || — || March 9, 1994 || Caussols || E. W. Elst || — || align=right | 3.6 km || 
|-id=385 bgcolor=#FA8072
| 22385 Fujimoriboshi ||  ||  || March 14, 1994 || Nyukasa || M. Hirasawa, S. Suzuki || — || align=right | 3.3 km || 
|-id=386 bgcolor=#E9E9E9
| 22386 ||  || — || August 10, 1994 || La Silla || E. W. Elst || PAD || align=right | 5.3 km || 
|-id=387 bgcolor=#E9E9E9
| 22387 ||  || — || August 10, 1994 || La Silla || E. W. Elst || RAF || align=right | 2.7 km || 
|-id=388 bgcolor=#E9E9E9
| 22388 ||  || — || August 10, 1994 || La Silla || E. W. Elst || EUN || align=right | 3.5 km || 
|-id=389 bgcolor=#E9E9E9
| 22389 ||  || — || August 12, 1994 || La Silla || E. W. Elst || PAD || align=right | 5.5 km || 
|-id=390 bgcolor=#E9E9E9
| 22390 ||  || — || August 12, 1994 || La Silla || E. W. Elst || — || align=right | 3.0 km || 
|-id=391 bgcolor=#E9E9E9
| 22391 ||  || — || August 12, 1994 || La Silla || E. W. Elst || — || align=right | 4.6 km || 
|-id=392 bgcolor=#E9E9E9
| 22392 ||  || — || August 12, 1994 || La Silla || E. W. Elst || — || align=right | 3.8 km || 
|-id=393 bgcolor=#E9E9E9
| 22393 || 1994 QV || — || August 29, 1994 || Nachi-Katsuura || Y. Shimizu, T. Urata || — || align=right | 11 km || 
|-id=394 bgcolor=#E9E9E9
| 22394 Kondouakira || 1994 TO ||  || October 2, 1994 || Kitami || K. Endate, K. Watanabe || ADE || align=right | 9.4 km || 
|-id=395 bgcolor=#E9E9E9
| 22395 Ourakenji ||  ||  || October 2, 1994 || Kitami || K. Endate, K. Watanabe || — || align=right | 5.2 km || 
|-id=396 bgcolor=#E9E9E9
| 22396 || 1994 VR || — || November 3, 1994 || Oizumi || T. Kobayashi || — || align=right | 4.8 km || 
|-id=397 bgcolor=#E9E9E9
| 22397 ||  || — || November 4, 1994 || Kitami || K. Endate, K. Watanabe || GEF || align=right | 5.7 km || 
|-id=398 bgcolor=#d6d6d6
| 22398 ||  || — || November 27, 1994 || Oizumi || T. Kobayashi || KOR || align=right | 5.3 km || 
|-id=399 bgcolor=#d6d6d6
| 22399 || 1995 CB || — || February 1, 1995 || Oizumi || T. Kobayashi || — || align=right | 8.4 km || 
|-id=400 bgcolor=#d6d6d6
| 22400 || 1995 CC || — || February 1, 1995 || Oizumi || T. Kobayashi || — || align=right | 13 km || 
|}

22401–22500 

|-bgcolor=#d6d6d6
| 22401 Egisto ||  ||  || February 24, 1995 || Asiago || M. Tombelli || — || align=right | 15 km || 
|-id=402 bgcolor=#fefefe
| 22402 Goshi || 1995 GN ||  || April 3, 1995 || Kuma Kogen || A. Nakamura || — || align=right | 2.3 km || 
|-id=403 bgcolor=#fefefe
| 22403 Manjitludher || 1995 LK ||  || June 5, 1995 || Siding Spring || D. J. Asher || — || align=right | 4.3 km || 
|-id=404 bgcolor=#C2FFFF
| 22404 ||  || — || June 29, 1995 || Kitt Peak || Spacewatch || L4 || align=right | 21 km || 
|-id=405 bgcolor=#fefefe
| 22405 Gavioliremo || 1995 OB ||  || July 19, 1995 || Cavezzo || Cavezzo Obs. || FLO || align=right | 2.8 km || 
|-id=406 bgcolor=#fefefe
| 22406 Garyboyle ||  ||  || August 22, 1995 || Kitt Peak || Spacewatch || — || align=right | 2.6 km || 
|-id=407 bgcolor=#fefefe
| 22407 ||  || — || September 17, 1995 || Nachi-Katsuura || Y. Shimizu, T. Urata || NYS || align=right | 4.7 km || 
|-id=408 bgcolor=#E9E9E9
| 22408 ||  || — || September 20, 1995 || Kushiro || S. Ueda, H. Kaneda || — || align=right | 8.2 km || 
|-id=409 bgcolor=#fefefe
| 22409 Nagatohideaki ||  ||  || September 20, 1995 || Kitami || K. Endate, K. Watanabe || — || align=right | 4.4 km || 
|-id=410 bgcolor=#E9E9E9
| 22410 Grinspoon ||  ||  || September 29, 1995 || Kitt Peak || Spacewatch || — || align=right | 2.2 km || 
|-id=411 bgcolor=#fefefe
| 22411 || 1995 TR || — || October 2, 1995 || Oizumi || T. Kobayashi || V || align=right | 3.2 km || 
|-id=412 bgcolor=#fefefe
| 22412 ||  || — || October 25, 1995 || Oizumi || T. Kobayashi || — || align=right | 12 km || 
|-id=413 bgcolor=#fefefe
| 22413 Haifu ||  ||  || October 17, 1995 || Kitt Peak || Spacewatch || — || align=right | 2.3 km || 
|-id=414 bgcolor=#E9E9E9
| 22414 Hornschemeier ||  ||  || October 17, 1995 || Kitt Peak || Spacewatch || — || align=right | 2.6 km || 
|-id=415 bgcolor=#fefefe
| 22415 Humeivey ||  ||  || October 19, 1995 || Kitt Peak || Spacewatch || — || align=right | 2.5 km || 
|-id=416 bgcolor=#E9E9E9
| 22416 Tanimotoyoshi ||  ||  || October 28, 1995 || Kitami || K. Endate, K. Watanabe || — || align=right | 3.1 km || 
|-id=417 bgcolor=#E9E9E9
| 22417 ||  || — || November 18, 1995 || Oizumi || T. Kobayashi || — || align=right | 4.9 km || 
|-id=418 bgcolor=#E9E9E9
| 22418 ||  || — || November 20, 1995 || Oizumi || T. Kobayashi || — || align=right | 5.0 km || 
|-id=419 bgcolor=#E9E9E9
| 22419 ||  || — || November 24, 1995 || Oizumi || T. Kobayashi || — || align=right | 6.4 km || 
|-id=420 bgcolor=#d6d6d6
| 22420 ||  || — || November 28, 1995 || Xinglong || SCAP || — || align=right | 3.7 km || 
|-id=421 bgcolor=#E9E9E9
| 22421 Jamesedgar ||  ||  || December 14, 1995 || Kitt Peak || Spacewatch || — || align=right | 3.9 km || 
|-id=422 bgcolor=#E9E9E9
| 22422 Kenmount Hill ||  ||  || December 16, 1995 || Kitt Peak || Spacewatch || — || align=right | 4.1 km || 
|-id=423 bgcolor=#E9E9E9
| 22423 Kudlacek ||  ||  || December 19, 1995 || Kitt Peak || Spacewatch || MAR || align=right | 3.1 km || 
|-id=424 bgcolor=#E9E9E9
| 22424 ||  || — || December 20, 1995 || Haleakala || NEAT || — || align=right | 4.1 km || 
|-id=425 bgcolor=#E9E9E9
| 22425 || 1996 AZ || — || January 11, 1996 || Oizumi || T. Kobayashi || — || align=right | 4.9 km || 
|-id=426 bgcolor=#E9E9E9
| 22426 Mikehanes ||  ||  || January 13, 1996 || Kitt Peak || Spacewatch || — || align=right | 4.2 km || 
|-id=427 bgcolor=#d6d6d6
| 22427 || 1996 DB || — || February 18, 1996 || Oizumi || T. Kobayashi || Tj (2.99) || align=right | 9.9 km || 
|-id=428 bgcolor=#d6d6d6
| 22428 || 1996 DT || — || February 19, 1996 || Oizumi || T. Kobayashi || EOS || align=right | 7.5 km || 
|-id=429 bgcolor=#E9E9E9
| 22429 Jurašek ||  ||  || February 22, 1996 || Modra || A. Galád, A. Pravda || HNS || align=right | 2.9 km || 
|-id=430 bgcolor=#E9E9E9
| 22430 ||  || — || February 23, 1996 || Oizumi || T. Kobayashi || NEM || align=right | 6.7 km || 
|-id=431 bgcolor=#d6d6d6
| 22431 ||  || — || February 28, 1996 || Church Stretton || S. P. Laurie || KOR || align=right | 5.2 km || 
|-id=432 bgcolor=#d6d6d6
| 22432 Pamgriffin ||  ||  || March 12, 1996 || Kitt Peak || Spacewatch || — || align=right | 8.0 km || 
|-id=433 bgcolor=#d6d6d6
| 22433 ||  || — || April 9, 1996 || Kiyosato || S. Otomo || — || align=right | 11 km || 
|-id=434 bgcolor=#d6d6d6
| 22434 Peredery ||  ||  || April 11, 1996 || Kitt Peak || Spacewatch || HYG || align=right | 9.4 km || 
|-id=435 bgcolor=#d6d6d6
| 22435 Pierfederici ||  ||  || April 12, 1996 || Kitt Peak || Spacewatch || THM || align=right | 7.4 km || 
|-id=436 bgcolor=#d6d6d6
| 22436 ||  || — || April 15, 1996 || La Silla || E. W. Elst || — || align=right | 12 km || 
|-id=437 bgcolor=#d6d6d6
| 22437 ||  || — || April 15, 1996 || La Silla || E. W. Elst || — || align=right | 10 km || 
|-id=438 bgcolor=#d6d6d6
| 22438 ||  || — || April 18, 1996 || La Silla || E. W. Elst || THM || align=right | 7.4 km || 
|-id=439 bgcolor=#d6d6d6
| 22439 ||  || — || April 18, 1996 || La Silla || E. W. Elst || THM || align=right | 9.1 km || 
|-id=440 bgcolor=#d6d6d6
| 22440 Bangsgaard || 1996 KA ||  || May 17, 1996 || Modra || A. Galád, A. Pravda || THB || align=right | 13 km || 
|-id=441 bgcolor=#fefefe
| 22441 ||  || — || August 8, 1996 || La Silla || E. W. Elst || — || align=right | 2.3 km || 
|-id=442 bgcolor=#fefefe
| 22442 Blaha ||  ||  || October 14, 1996 || Kleť || J. Tichá, M. Tichý || — || align=right | 2.0 km || 
|-id=443 bgcolor=#fefefe
| 22443 ||  || — || October 11, 1996 || Kitami || K. Endate || — || align=right | 1.6 km || 
|-id=444 bgcolor=#fefefe
| 22444 ||  || — || October 15, 1996 || Nachi-Katsuura || Y. Shimizu, T. Urata || — || align=right | 2.0 km || 
|-id=445 bgcolor=#fefefe
| 22445 ||  || — || October 9, 1996 || Kushiro || S. Ueda, H. Kaneda || — || align=right | 3.5 km || 
|-id=446 bgcolor=#fefefe
| 22446 Philwhitney ||  ||  || October 6, 1996 || Kitt Peak || Spacewatch || — || align=right | 2.4 km || 
|-id=447 bgcolor=#fefefe
| 22447 ||  || — || October 10, 1996 || Kitt Peak || Spacewatch || — || align=right | 3.1 km || 
|-id=448 bgcolor=#fefefe
| 22448 Ricksaunders ||  ||  || October 11, 1996 || Kitt Peak || Spacewatch || — || align=right | 1.9 km || 
|-id=449 bgcolor=#FA8072
| 22449 Ottijeff || 1996 VC ||  || November 1, 1996 || Catalina Station || T. B. Spahr || — || align=right | 3.8 km || 
|-id=450 bgcolor=#E9E9E9
| 22450 Nové Hrady || 1996 VN ||  || November 3, 1996 || Kleť || J. Tichá, M. Tichý || — || align=right | 4.0 km || 
|-id=451 bgcolor=#E9E9E9
| 22451 Tymothycoons ||  ||  || November 13, 1996 || Campo Imperatore || A. Boattini, A. Di Paola || — || align=right | 4.3 km || 
|-id=452 bgcolor=#E9E9E9
| 22452 ||  || — || November 3, 1996 || Kushiro || S. Ueda, H. Kaneda || — || align=right | 5.6 km || 
|-id=453 bgcolor=#fefefe
| 22453 Shibusawaeiichi ||  ||  || November 7, 1996 || Kitami || K. Endate, K. Watanabe || FLO || align=right | 2.9 km || 
|-id=454 bgcolor=#fefefe
| 22454 Rosalylopes ||  ||  || November 6, 1996 || Kitt Peak || Spacewatch || — || align=right | 2.0 km || 
|-id=455 bgcolor=#fefefe
| 22455 ||  || — || December 2, 1996 || Oizumi || T. Kobayashi || NYS || align=right | 1.8 km || 
|-id=456 bgcolor=#fefefe
| 22456 Salopek ||  ||  || December 4, 1996 || Kitt Peak || Spacewatch || — || align=right | 2.4 km || 
|-id=457 bgcolor=#fefefe
| 22457 ||  || — || December 10, 1996 || Xinglong || SCAP || — || align=right | 3.7 km || 
|-id=458 bgcolor=#fefefe
| 22458 ||  || — || December 14, 1996 || Oizumi || T. Kobayashi || FLO || align=right | 2.3 km || 
|-id=459 bgcolor=#fefefe
| 22459 ||  || — || January 3, 1997 || Oizumi || T. Kobayashi || — || align=right | 4.7 km || 
|-id=460 bgcolor=#fefefe
| 22460 ||  || — || January 3, 1997 || Oizumi || T. Kobayashi || — || align=right | 4.1 km || 
|-id=461 bgcolor=#fefefe
| 22461 ||  || — || January 9, 1997 || Oizumi || T. Kobayashi || — || align=right | 2.7 km || 
|-id=462 bgcolor=#fefefe
| 22462 ||  || — || January 9, 1997 || Oizumi || T. Kobayashi || — || align=right | 3.8 km || 
|-id=463 bgcolor=#fefefe
| 22463 ||  || — || January 11, 1997 || Haleakala || NEAT || NYS || align=right | 2.1 km || 
|-id=464 bgcolor=#E9E9E9
| 22464 ||  || — || January 4, 1997 || Xinglong || SCAP || MIT || align=right | 12 km || 
|-id=465 bgcolor=#fefefe
| 22465 Karelanděl ||  ||  || January 15, 1997 || Kleť || M. Tichý, Z. Moravec || NYS || align=right | 1.8 km || 
|-id=466 bgcolor=#fefefe
| 22466 ||  || — || January 30, 1997 || Oizumi || T. Kobayashi || NYS || align=right | 2.5 km || 
|-id=467 bgcolor=#fefefe
| 22467 Koharumi ||  ||  || January 30, 1997 || Oizumi || T. Kobayashi || V || align=right | 3.1 km || 
|-id=468 bgcolor=#E9E9E9
| 22468 ||  || — || February 1, 1997 || Oizumi || T. Kobayashi || — || align=right | 2.7 km || 
|-id=469 bgcolor=#fefefe
| 22469 Poloniny ||  ||  || February 2, 1997 || Modra || P. Kolény, L. Kornoš || — || align=right | 1.7 km || 
|-id=470 bgcolor=#fefefe
| 22470 Shirakawa-go ||  ||  || February 9, 1997 || Chichibu || N. Satō || MAS || align=right | 2.3 km || 
|-id=471 bgcolor=#E9E9E9
| 22471 ||  || — || February 2, 1997 || Xinglong || SCAP || — || align=right | 2.8 km || 
|-id=472 bgcolor=#fefefe
| 22472 ||  || — || February 6, 1997 || Xinglong || SCAP || — || align=right | 2.7 km || 
|-id=473 bgcolor=#E9E9E9
| 22473 Stanleyhey ||  ||  || March 2, 1997 || Kitt Peak || Spacewatch || ADE || align=right | 6.7 km || 
|-id=474 bgcolor=#E9E9E9
| 22474 Frobenius ||  ||  || March 8, 1997 || Prescott || P. G. Comba || — || align=right | 2.2 km || 
|-id=475 bgcolor=#E9E9E9
| 22475 Stanrunge ||  ||  || March 3, 1997 || Kitt Peak || Spacewatch || — || align=right | 3.9 km || 
|-id=476 bgcolor=#E9E9E9
| 22476 ||  || — || March 8, 1997 || Xinglong || SCAP || EUN || align=right | 10 km || 
|-id=477 bgcolor=#E9E9E9
| 22477 Julimacoraor ||  ||  || March 10, 1997 || Socorro || LINEAR || — || align=right | 2.8 km || 
|-id=478 bgcolor=#E9E9E9
| 22478 ||  || — || March 11, 1997 || La Silla || E. W. Elst || — || align=right | 2.7 km || 
|-id=479 bgcolor=#E9E9E9
| 22479 ||  || — || March 29, 1997 || Xinglong || SCAP || INO || align=right | 4.7 km || 
|-id=480 bgcolor=#E9E9E9
| 22480 Maedatoshihisa ||  ||  || April 3, 1997 || Kitami || K. Endate, K. Watanabe || WIT || align=right | 4.8 km || 
|-id=481 bgcolor=#E9E9E9
| 22481 Zachlynn ||  ||  || April 3, 1997 || Socorro || LINEAR || — || align=right | 9.2 km || 
|-id=482 bgcolor=#d6d6d6
| 22482 Michbertier ||  ||  || April 3, 1997 || Socorro || LINEAR || — || align=right | 8.2 km || 
|-id=483 bgcolor=#E9E9E9
| 22483 ||  || — || April 3, 1997 || Socorro || LINEAR || ADE || align=right | 4.8 km || 
|-id=484 bgcolor=#d6d6d6
| 22484 ||  || — || April 6, 1997 || Socorro || LINEAR || KOR || align=right | 6.0 km || 
|-id=485 bgcolor=#E9E9E9
| 22485 Unterman ||  ||  || April 6, 1997 || Socorro || LINEAR || — || align=right | 3.9 km || 
|-id=486 bgcolor=#E9E9E9
| 22486 ||  || — || April 6, 1997 || Socorro || LINEAR || — || align=right | 3.3 km || 
|-id=487 bgcolor=#E9E9E9
| 22487 Megphillips ||  ||  || April 6, 1997 || Socorro || LINEAR || MRX || align=right | 3.6 km || 
|-id=488 bgcolor=#d6d6d6
| 22488 Martyschwartz ||  ||  || April 7, 1997 || Socorro || LINEAR || EOS || align=right | 4.5 km || 
|-id=489 bgcolor=#E9E9E9
| 22489 Yanaka ||  ||  || April 7, 1997 || Kuma Kogen || A. Nakamura || EUN || align=right | 5.7 km || 
|-id=490 bgcolor=#E9E9E9
| 22490 Zigamiyama ||  ||  || April 11, 1997 || Nanyo || T. Okuni || — || align=right | 3.9 km || 
|-id=491 bgcolor=#E9E9E9
| 22491 ||  || — || April 3, 1997 || Socorro || LINEAR || HEN || align=right | 5.1 km || 
|-id=492 bgcolor=#d6d6d6
| 22492 Mosig ||  ||  || April 6, 1997 || Socorro || LINEAR || KOR || align=right | 3.7 km || 
|-id=493 bgcolor=#d6d6d6
| 22493 ||  || — || April 7, 1997 || La Silla || E. W. Elst || — || align=right | 6.9 km || 
|-id=494 bgcolor=#fefefe
| 22494 Trillium || 1997 JL ||  || May 2, 1997 || Kitt Peak || Spacewatch || — || align=right | 2.5 km || 
|-id=495 bgcolor=#E9E9E9
| 22495 Fubini ||  ||  || May 6, 1997 || Prescott || P. G. Comba || DOR || align=right | 5.1 km || 
|-id=496 bgcolor=#E9E9E9
| 22496 ||  || — || May 3, 1997 || La Silla || E. W. Elst || — || align=right | 3.5 km || 
|-id=497 bgcolor=#d6d6d6
| 22497 Immanuelfuchs || 1997 KG ||  || May 30, 1997 || Prescott || P. G. Comba || KOR || align=right | 4.1 km || 
|-id=498 bgcolor=#d6d6d6
| 22498 Willman ||  ||  || June 5, 1997 || Kitt Peak || Spacewatch || — || align=right | 8.7 km || 
|-id=499 bgcolor=#d6d6d6
| 22499 Wunibaldkamm ||  ||  || June 27, 1997 || Kitt Peak || Spacewatch || — || align=right | 8.4 km || 
|-id=500 bgcolor=#d6d6d6
| 22500 Grazianoventre || 1997 OJ ||  || July 26, 1997 || Sormano || P. Sicoli, A. Testa || — || align=right | 11 km || 
|}

22501–22600 

|-bgcolor=#fefefe
| 22501 ||  || — || August 5, 1997 || Xinglong || SCAP || EUT || align=right | 1.9 km || 
|-id=502 bgcolor=#fefefe
| 22502 || 1997 SW || — || September 16, 1997 || Xinglong || SCAP || V || align=right | 2.0 km || 
|-id=503 bgcolor=#C2FFFF
| 22503 Thalpius ||  ||  || October 7, 1997 || Kleť || M. Tichý, Z. Moravec || L4 || align=right | 16 km || 
|-id=504 bgcolor=#fefefe
| 22504 ||  || — || October 6, 1997 || Nachi-Katsuura || Y. Shimizu, T. Urata || FLO || align=right | 2.8 km || 
|-id=505 bgcolor=#fefefe
| 22505 Lewit || 1997 UF ||  || October 19, 1997 || Ondřejov || L. Kotková || — || align=right | 2.4 km || 
|-id=506 bgcolor=#fefefe
| 22506 ||  || — || November 24, 1997 || Oizumi || T. Kobayashi || NYS || align=right | 2.6 km || 
|-id=507 bgcolor=#fefefe
| 22507 ||  || — || November 29, 1997 || Socorro || LINEAR || NYS || align=right | 2.6 km || 
|-id=508 bgcolor=#d6d6d6
| 22508 ||  || — || November 29, 1997 || Socorro || LINEAR || THM || align=right | 7.0 km || 
|-id=509 bgcolor=#fefefe
| 22509 ||  || — || December 24, 1997 || Oizumi || T. Kobayashi || — || align=right | 3.6 km || 
|-id=510 bgcolor=#fefefe
| 22510 ||  || — || December 21, 1997 || Kitt Peak || Spacewatch || — || align=right | 2.2 km || 
|-id=511 bgcolor=#E9E9E9
| 22511 ||  || — || December 28, 1997 || Oizumi || T. Kobayashi || — || align=right | 3.0 km || 
|-id=512 bgcolor=#E9E9E9
| 22512 Cannat ||  ||  || January 28, 1998 || Caussols || ODAS || GER || align=right | 4.4 km || 
|-id=513 bgcolor=#fefefe
| 22513 ||  || — || January 29, 1998 || Caussols || ODAS || FLO || align=right | 1.8 km || 
|-id=514 bgcolor=#fefefe
| 22514 ||  || — || February 22, 1998 || Haleakala || NEAT || — || align=right | 7.2 km || 
|-id=515 bgcolor=#fefefe
| 22515 ||  || — || February 22, 1998 || Haleakala || NEAT || V || align=right | 2.4 km || 
|-id=516 bgcolor=#E9E9E9
| 22516 ||  || — || February 26, 1998 || Kitt Peak || Spacewatch || — || align=right | 3.9 km || 
|-id=517 bgcolor=#fefefe
| 22517 Alexzanardi ||  ||  || February 26, 1998 || Cima Ekar || M. Tombelli, G. Forti || — || align=right | 3.3 km || 
|-id=518 bgcolor=#fefefe
| 22518 ||  || — || February 27, 1998 || La Silla || E. W. Elst || NYS || align=right | 2.9 km || 
|-id=519 bgcolor=#fefefe
| 22519 Gerardklein ||  ||  || March 2, 1998 || Caussols || ODAS || — || align=right | 2.2 km || 
|-id=520 bgcolor=#fefefe
| 22520 ||  || — || March 2, 1998 || Caussols || ODAS || — || align=right | 2.6 km || 
|-id=521 bgcolor=#fefefe
| 22521 ZZ Top ||  ||  || March 2, 1998 || Caussols || ODAS || V || align=right | 1.4 km || 
|-id=522 bgcolor=#fefefe
| 22522 ||  || — || March 2, 1998 || Nachi-Katsuura || Y. Shimizu, T. Urata || PHO || align=right | 3.2 km || 
|-id=523 bgcolor=#fefefe
| 22523 ||  || — || March 1, 1998 || La Silla || E. W. Elst || — || align=right | 3.5 km || 
|-id=524 bgcolor=#fefefe
| 22524 ||  || — || March 18, 1998 || Kitt Peak || Spacewatch || fast? || align=right | 2.1 km || 
|-id=525 bgcolor=#fefefe
| 22525 ||  || — || March 24, 1998 || Haleakala || NEAT || — || align=right | 2.8 km || 
|-id=526 bgcolor=#fefefe
| 22526 ||  || — || March 22, 1998 || Majorca || Á. López J., R. Pacheco || — || align=right | 2.8 km || 
|-id=527 bgcolor=#fefefe
| 22527 Gawlik ||  ||  || March 20, 1998 || Socorro || LINEAR || FLO || align=right | 2.8 km || 
|-id=528 bgcolor=#fefefe
| 22528 Elysehope ||  ||  || March 20, 1998 || Socorro || LINEAR || — || align=right | 1.4 km || 
|-id=529 bgcolor=#d6d6d6
| 22529 ||  || — || March 20, 1998 || Socorro || LINEAR || EOS || align=right | 4.6 km || 
|-id=530 bgcolor=#fefefe
| 22530 Huynh-Le ||  ||  || March 20, 1998 || Socorro || LINEAR || FLO || align=right | 2.8 km || 
|-id=531 bgcolor=#fefefe
| 22531 Davidkelley ||  ||  || March 20, 1998 || Socorro || LINEAR || FLO || align=right | 2.3 km || 
|-id=532 bgcolor=#fefefe
| 22532 ||  || — || March 20, 1998 || Socorro || LINEAR || — || align=right | 1.8 km || 
|-id=533 bgcolor=#fefefe
| 22533 Krishnan ||  ||  || March 20, 1998 || Socorro || LINEAR || — || align=right | 3.6 km || 
|-id=534 bgcolor=#fefefe
| 22534 Lieblich ||  ||  || March 20, 1998 || Socorro || LINEAR || — || align=right | 2.3 km || 
|-id=535 bgcolor=#fefefe
| 22535 ||  || — || March 20, 1998 || Socorro || LINEAR || — || align=right | 2.4 km || 
|-id=536 bgcolor=#E9E9E9
| 22536 Katelowry ||  ||  || March 20, 1998 || Socorro || LINEAR || — || align=right | 6.2 km || 
|-id=537 bgcolor=#E9E9E9
| 22537 Meyerowitz ||  ||  || March 20, 1998 || Socorro || LINEAR || PAD || align=right | 8.1 km || 
|-id=538 bgcolor=#fefefe
| 22538 Lucasmoller ||  ||  || March 20, 1998 || Socorro || LINEAR || — || align=right | 2.4 km || 
|-id=539 bgcolor=#fefefe
| 22539 ||  || — || March 20, 1998 || Socorro || LINEAR || — || align=right | 3.1 km || 
|-id=540 bgcolor=#d6d6d6
| 22540 Mork ||  ||  || March 20, 1998 || Socorro || LINEAR || KOR || align=right | 3.6 km || 
|-id=541 bgcolor=#fefefe
| 22541 ||  || — || March 20, 1998 || Socorro || LINEAR || — || align=right | 2.6 km || 
|-id=542 bgcolor=#fefefe
| 22542 Pendri ||  ||  || March 20, 1998 || Socorro || LINEAR || FLO || align=right | 1.9 km || 
|-id=543 bgcolor=#fefefe
| 22543 Ranjan ||  ||  || March 24, 1998 || Socorro || LINEAR || — || align=right | 1.6 km || 
|-id=544 bgcolor=#fefefe
| 22544 Sarahrapo ||  ||  || March 24, 1998 || Socorro || LINEAR || — || align=right | 2.2 km || 
|-id=545 bgcolor=#fefefe
| 22545 Brittrusso ||  ||  || March 24, 1998 || Socorro || LINEAR || — || align=right | 2.7 km || 
|-id=546 bgcolor=#fefefe
| 22546 Schickler ||  ||  || March 24, 1998 || Socorro || LINEAR || FLO || align=right | 1.8 km || 
|-id=547 bgcolor=#E9E9E9
| 22547 Kimberscott ||  ||  || March 24, 1998 || Socorro || LINEAR || — || align=right | 3.7 km || 
|-id=548 bgcolor=#fefefe
| 22548 ||  || — || March 24, 1998 || Socorro || LINEAR || — || align=right | 2.8 km || 
|-id=549 bgcolor=#d6d6d6
| 22549 ||  || — || March 24, 1998 || Socorro || LINEAR || EOS || align=right | 5.6 km || 
|-id=550 bgcolor=#fefefe
| 22550 Jonsellon ||  ||  || March 31, 1998 || Socorro || LINEAR || — || align=right | 3.1 km || 
|-id=551 bgcolor=#fefefe
| 22551 Adamsolomon ||  ||  || March 31, 1998 || Socorro || LINEAR || — || align=right | 1.8 km || 
|-id=552 bgcolor=#d6d6d6
| 22552 ||  || — || March 31, 1998 || Socorro || LINEAR || EOS || align=right | 6.2 km || 
|-id=553 bgcolor=#fefefe
| 22553 Yisun ||  ||  || March 31, 1998 || Socorro || LINEAR || V || align=right | 2.2 km || 
|-id=554 bgcolor=#fefefe
| 22554 Shoshanatell ||  ||  || March 31, 1998 || Socorro || LINEAR || — || align=right | 3.5 km || 
|-id=555 bgcolor=#E9E9E9
| 22555 Joevellone ||  ||  || March 31, 1998 || Socorro || LINEAR || — || align=right | 2.4 km || 
|-id=556 bgcolor=#fefefe
| 22556 ||  || — || March 20, 1998 || Socorro || LINEAR || — || align=right | 2.3 km || 
|-id=557 bgcolor=#fefefe
| 22557 ||  || — || March 29, 1998 || Socorro || LINEAR || — || align=right | 2.5 km || 
|-id=558 bgcolor=#fefefe
| 22558 Mladen ||  ||  || April 22, 1998 || Modra || P. Kolény, L. Kornoš || — || align=right | 1.7 km || 
|-id=559 bgcolor=#fefefe
| 22559 ||  || — || April 19, 1998 || Kitt Peak || Spacewatch || — || align=right | 3.1 km || 
|-id=560 bgcolor=#E9E9E9
| 22560 ||  || — || April 18, 1998 || Socorro || LINEAR || — || align=right | 5.7 km || 
|-id=561 bgcolor=#fefefe
| 22561 Miviscardi ||  ||  || April 18, 1998 || Socorro || LINEAR || — || align=right | 2.3 km || 
|-id=562 bgcolor=#E9E9E9
| 22562 Wage ||  ||  || April 18, 1998 || Socorro || LINEAR || — || align=right | 7.2 km || 
|-id=563 bgcolor=#fefefe
| 22563 Xinwang ||  ||  || April 18, 1998 || Socorro || LINEAR || — || align=right | 3.3 km || 
|-id=564 bgcolor=#fefefe
| 22564 Jeffreyxing ||  ||  || April 20, 1998 || Socorro || LINEAR || FLO || align=right | 1.9 km || 
|-id=565 bgcolor=#fefefe
| 22565 ||  || — || April 20, 1998 || Socorro || LINEAR || NYS || align=right | 2.0 km || 
|-id=566 bgcolor=#fefefe
| 22566 Irazaitseva ||  ||  || April 20, 1998 || Socorro || LINEAR || — || align=right | 2.2 km || 
|-id=567 bgcolor=#fefefe
| 22567 Zenisek ||  ||  || April 20, 1998 || Socorro || LINEAR || V || align=right | 2.1 km || 
|-id=568 bgcolor=#fefefe
| 22568 ||  || — || April 20, 1998 || Socorro || LINEAR || NYS || align=right | 2.6 km || 
|-id=569 bgcolor=#fefefe
| 22569 ||  || — || April 20, 1998 || Socorro || LINEAR || — || align=right | 3.9 km || 
|-id=570 bgcolor=#fefefe
| 22570 Harleyzhang ||  ||  || April 20, 1998 || Socorro || LINEAR || — || align=right | 4.0 km || 
|-id=571 bgcolor=#fefefe
| 22571 Letianzhang ||  ||  || April 20, 1998 || Socorro || LINEAR || FLO || align=right | 3.1 km || 
|-id=572 bgcolor=#fefefe
| 22572 Yuanzhang ||  ||  || April 20, 1998 || Socorro || LINEAR || NYS || align=right | 2.0 km || 
|-id=573 bgcolor=#fefefe
| 22573 Johnzhou ||  ||  || April 20, 1998 || Socorro || LINEAR || — || align=right | 2.0 km || 
|-id=574 bgcolor=#fefefe
| 22574 ||  || — || April 20, 1998 || Socorro || LINEAR || — || align=right | 2.8 km || 
|-id=575 bgcolor=#fefefe
| 22575 Jayallen ||  ||  || April 20, 1998 || Socorro || LINEAR || — || align=right | 2.8 km || 
|-id=576 bgcolor=#fefefe
| 22576 ||  || — || April 20, 1998 || Socorro || LINEAR || — || align=right | 3.7 km || 
|-id=577 bgcolor=#fefefe
| 22577 Alfiuccio ||  ||  || April 30, 1998 || Anderson Mesa || LONEOS || — || align=right | 3.2 km || 
|-id=578 bgcolor=#fefefe
| 22578 ||  || — || April 21, 1998 || Socorro || LINEAR || NYS || align=right | 3.0 km || 
|-id=579 bgcolor=#fefefe
| 22579 Marcyeager ||  ||  || April 21, 1998 || Socorro || LINEAR || NYS || align=right | 2.1 km || 
|-id=580 bgcolor=#fefefe
| 22580 Kenkaplan ||  ||  || April 21, 1998 || Socorro || LINEAR || FLO || align=right | 3.7 km || 
|-id=581 bgcolor=#fefefe
| 22581 Rosahemphill ||  ||  || April 21, 1998 || Socorro || LINEAR || MAS || align=right | 2.8 km || 
|-id=582 bgcolor=#fefefe
| 22582 Patmiller ||  ||  || April 21, 1998 || Socorro || LINEAR || NYS || align=right | 3.9 km || 
|-id=583 bgcolor=#fefefe
| 22583 Metzler ||  ||  || April 21, 1998 || Socorro || LINEAR || — || align=right | 3.2 km || 
|-id=584 bgcolor=#fefefe
| 22584 Winigleason ||  ||  || April 21, 1998 || Socorro || LINEAR || — || align=right | 2.9 km || 
|-id=585 bgcolor=#E9E9E9
| 22585 ||  || — || April 21, 1998 || Socorro || LINEAR || — || align=right | 3.1 km || 
|-id=586 bgcolor=#fefefe
| 22586 Shellyhynes ||  ||  || April 21, 1998 || Socorro || LINEAR || — || align=right | 2.9 km || 
|-id=587 bgcolor=#fefefe
| 22587 McKennon ||  ||  || April 21, 1998 || Socorro || LINEAR || V || align=right | 1.6 km || 
|-id=588 bgcolor=#E9E9E9
| 22588 ||  || — || April 21, 1998 || Socorro || LINEAR || EUN || align=right | 3.6 km || 
|-id=589 bgcolor=#fefefe
| 22589 Minor ||  ||  || April 21, 1998 || Socorro || LINEAR || — || align=right | 2.3 km || 
|-id=590 bgcolor=#fefefe
| 22590 ||  || — || April 25, 1998 || La Silla || E. W. Elst || FLO || align=right | 2.1 km || 
|-id=591 bgcolor=#fefefe
| 22591 ||  || — || April 25, 1998 || La Silla || E. W. Elst || FLO || align=right | 2.3 km || 
|-id=592 bgcolor=#fefefe
| 22592 ||  || — || April 25, 1998 || La Silla || E. W. Elst || — || align=right | 6.8 km || 
|-id=593 bgcolor=#fefefe
| 22593 ||  || — || April 23, 1998 || Socorro || LINEAR || — || align=right | 3.6 km || 
|-id=594 bgcolor=#fefefe
| 22594 Stoops ||  ||  || April 23, 1998 || Socorro || LINEAR || — || align=right | 2.7 km || 
|-id=595 bgcolor=#d6d6d6
| 22595 ||  || — || April 23, 1998 || Socorro || LINEAR || EOS || align=right | 7.1 km || 
|-id=596 bgcolor=#fefefe
| 22596 Kathwallace ||  ||  || April 23, 1998 || Socorro || LINEAR || — || align=right | 2.3 km || 
|-id=597 bgcolor=#fefefe
| 22597 Lynzielinski ||  ||  || April 23, 1998 || Socorro || LINEAR || — || align=right | 2.1 km || 
|-id=598 bgcolor=#fefefe
| 22598 Francespearl ||  ||  || April 23, 1998 || Socorro || LINEAR || FLO || align=right | 2.9 km || 
|-id=599 bgcolor=#fefefe
| 22599 Heatherhall ||  ||  || April 23, 1998 || Socorro || LINEAR || V || align=right | 1.7 km || 
|-id=600 bgcolor=#E9E9E9
| 22600 ||  || — || April 23, 1998 || Socorro || LINEAR || AER || align=right | 6.3 km || 
|}

22601–22700 

|-bgcolor=#FA8072
| 22601 ||  || — || April 23, 1998 || Socorro || LINEAR || — || align=right | 6.1 km || 
|-id=602 bgcolor=#fefefe
| 22602 ||  || — || April 23, 1998 || Socorro || LINEAR || — || align=right | 3.1 km || 
|-id=603 bgcolor=#E9E9E9
| 22603 Davidoconnor ||  ||  || April 19, 1998 || Socorro || LINEAR || — || align=right | 3.5 km || 
|-id=604 bgcolor=#E9E9E9
| 22604 ||  || — || April 21, 1998 || Socorro || LINEAR || — || align=right | 5.5 km || 
|-id=605 bgcolor=#fefefe
| 22605 Steverumsey ||  ||  || April 23, 1998 || Socorro || LINEAR || — || align=right | 2.4 km || 
|-id=606 bgcolor=#fefefe
| 22606 ||  || — || April 25, 1998 || La Silla || E. W. Elst || — || align=right | 5.4 km || 
|-id=607 bgcolor=#E9E9E9
| 22607 ||  || — || April 25, 1998 || La Silla || E. W. Elst || — || align=right | 5.0 km || 
|-id=608 bgcolor=#fefefe
| 22608 ||  || — || May 1, 1998 || Haleakala || NEAT || NYS || align=right | 2.2 km || 
|-id=609 bgcolor=#fefefe
| 22609 ||  || — || May 1, 1998 || Haleakala || NEAT || NYS || align=right | 3.4 km || 
|-id=610 bgcolor=#fefefe
| 22610 ||  || — || May 6, 1998 || Višnjan Observatory || Višnjan Obs. || FLO || align=right | 2.9 km || 
|-id=611 bgcolor=#E9E9E9
| 22611 Galerkin || 1998 KB ||  || May 17, 1998 || Prescott || P. G. Comba || — || align=right | 2.4 km || 
|-id=612 bgcolor=#E9E9E9
| 22612 Dandibner ||  ||  || May 22, 1998 || Anderson Mesa || LONEOS || — || align=right | 4.5 km || 
|-id=613 bgcolor=#fefefe
| 22613 Callander ||  ||  || May 22, 1998 || Anderson Mesa || LONEOS || — || align=right | 2.6 km || 
|-id=614 bgcolor=#d6d6d6
| 22614 ||  || — || May 24, 1998 || Kitt Peak || Spacewatch || — || align=right | 6.9 km || 
|-id=615 bgcolor=#E9E9E9
| 22615 ||  || — || May 24, 1998 || Kitt Peak || Spacewatch || — || align=right | 4.5 km || 
|-id=616 bgcolor=#fefefe
| 22616 Bogolyubov ||  ||  || May 23, 1998 || Anderson Mesa || LONEOS || NYS || align=right | 3.4 km || 
|-id=617 bgcolor=#fefefe
| 22617 Vidphananu ||  ||  || May 23, 1998 || Anderson Mesa || LONEOS || — || align=right | 2.0 km || 
|-id=618 bgcolor=#fefefe
| 22618 Silva Nortica ||  ||  || May 28, 1998 || Kleť || M. Tichý || — || align=right | 2.7 km || 
|-id=619 bgcolor=#fefefe
| 22619 Ajscheetz ||  ||  || May 22, 1998 || Socorro || LINEAR || — || align=right | 2.8 km || 
|-id=620 bgcolor=#E9E9E9
| 22620 ||  || — || May 23, 1998 || Woomera || F. B. Zoltowski || — || align=right | 3.0 km || 
|-id=621 bgcolor=#E9E9E9
| 22621 Larrybartel ||  ||  || May 22, 1998 || Socorro || LINEAR || — || align=right | 5.6 km || 
|-id=622 bgcolor=#fefefe
| 22622 Strong ||  ||  || May 22, 1998 || Socorro || LINEAR || — || align=right | 3.4 km || 
|-id=623 bgcolor=#fefefe
| 22623 Fisico ||  ||  || May 22, 1998 || Socorro || LINEAR || FLO || align=right | 1.8 km || 
|-id=624 bgcolor=#d6d6d6
| 22624 ||  || — || May 22, 1998 || Socorro || LINEAR || EOS || align=right | 6.3 km || 
|-id=625 bgcolor=#fefefe
| 22625 Kanipe ||  ||  || May 22, 1998 || Socorro || LINEAR || FLO || align=right | 2.5 km || 
|-id=626 bgcolor=#fefefe
| 22626 Jengordinier ||  ||  || May 22, 1998 || Socorro || LINEAR || — || align=right | 2.2 km || 
|-id=627 bgcolor=#fefefe
| 22627 Aviscardi ||  ||  || May 22, 1998 || Socorro || LINEAR || — || align=right | 2.7 km || 
|-id=628 bgcolor=#fefefe
| 22628 Michaelallen ||  ||  || May 22, 1998 || Socorro || LINEAR || NYS || align=right | 5.6 km || 
|-id=629 bgcolor=#E9E9E9
| 22629 ||  || — || May 22, 1998 || Socorro || LINEAR || EUN || align=right | 6.8 km || 
|-id=630 bgcolor=#fefefe
| 22630 Wallmuth ||  ||  || May 22, 1998 || Socorro || LINEAR || NYS || align=right | 5.5 km || 
|-id=631 bgcolor=#fefefe
| 22631 Dillard ||  ||  || May 22, 1998 || Socorro || LINEAR || — || align=right | 3.1 km || 
|-id=632 bgcolor=#fefefe
| 22632 DiNovis ||  ||  || May 22, 1998 || Socorro || LINEAR || — || align=right | 2.9 km || 
|-id=633 bgcolor=#fefefe
| 22633 Fazio ||  ||  || May 22, 1998 || Socorro || LINEAR || NYS || align=right | 2.6 km || 
|-id=634 bgcolor=#d6d6d6
| 22634 ||  || — || June 22, 1998 || Woomera || F. B. Zoltowski || THM || align=right | 6.5 km || 
|-id=635 bgcolor=#E9E9E9
| 22635 ||  || — || June 19, 1998 || Socorro || LINEAR || EUN || align=right | 5.7 km || 
|-id=636 bgcolor=#E9E9E9
| 22636 ||  || — || June 25, 1998 || Woomera || F. B. Zoltowski || HNS || align=right | 4.5 km || 
|-id=637 bgcolor=#E9E9E9
| 22637 ||  || — || June 24, 1998 || Socorro || LINEAR || EUN || align=right | 5.4 km || 
|-id=638 bgcolor=#E9E9E9
| 22638 Abdulla ||  ||  || June 24, 1998 || Socorro || LINEAR || — || align=right | 4.8 km || 
|-id=639 bgcolor=#fefefe
| 22639 Nickanthony ||  ||  || June 24, 1998 || Socorro || LINEAR || FLO || align=right | 2.7 km || 
|-id=640 bgcolor=#fefefe
| 22640 Shalilabaena ||  ||  || June 24, 1998 || Socorro || LINEAR || V || align=right | 2.6 km || 
|-id=641 bgcolor=#E9E9E9
| 22641 ||  || — || June 24, 1998 || Socorro || LINEAR || EUN || align=right | 3.9 km || 
|-id=642 bgcolor=#E9E9E9
| 22642 || 1998 NV || — || July 15, 1998 || Kitt Peak || Spacewatch || — || align=right | 4.3 km || 
|-id=643 bgcolor=#d6d6d6
| 22643 ||  || — || July 20, 1998 || Caussols || ODAS || — || align=right | 6.6 km || 
|-id=644 bgcolor=#d6d6d6
| 22644 Matejbel ||  ||  || July 27, 1998 || Ondřejov || P. Pravec, U. Babiaková || — || align=right | 7.3 km || 
|-id=645 bgcolor=#fefefe
| 22645 Rotblat ||  ||  || July 26, 1998 || Anderson Mesa || LONEOS || NYS || align=right | 2.7 km || 
|-id=646 bgcolor=#fefefe
| 22646 ||  || — || July 26, 1998 || La Silla || E. W. Elst || — || align=right | 3.3 km || 
|-id=647 bgcolor=#d6d6d6
| 22647 Lévi-Strauss ||  ||  || July 26, 1998 || La Silla || E. W. Elst || SHU3:2 || align=right | 13 km || 
|-id=648 bgcolor=#d6d6d6
| 22648 ||  || — || July 26, 1998 || La Silla || E. W. Elst || — || align=right | 4.5 km || 
|-id=649 bgcolor=#fefefe
| 22649 ||  || — || July 27, 1998 || Reedy Creek || J. Broughton || V || align=right | 3.0 km || 
|-id=650 bgcolor=#E9E9E9
| 22650 ||  || — || July 29, 1998 || Reedy Creek || J. Broughton || — || align=right | 9.2 km || 
|-id=651 bgcolor=#E9E9E9
| 22651 || 1998 QW || — || August 19, 1998 || Haleakala || NEAT || MAR || align=right | 7.0 km || 
|-id=652 bgcolor=#d6d6d6
| 22652 ||  || — || August 19, 1998 || Haleakala || NEAT || HYG || align=right | 9.4 km || 
|-id=653 bgcolor=#E9E9E9
| 22653 ||  || — || August 17, 1998 || Socorro || LINEAR || Tj (2.89) || align=right | 7.5 km || 
|-id=654 bgcolor=#fefefe
| 22654 ||  || — || August 22, 1998 || Xinglong || SCAP || V || align=right | 2.4 km || 
|-id=655 bgcolor=#d6d6d6
| 22655 ||  || — || August 17, 1998 || Socorro || LINEAR || EOS || align=right | 7.9 km || 
|-id=656 bgcolor=#fefefe
| 22656 Aaronburrows ||  ||  || August 17, 1998 || Socorro || LINEAR || NYS || align=right | 4.2 km || 
|-id=657 bgcolor=#E9E9E9
| 22657 ||  || — || August 17, 1998 || Socorro || LINEAR || — || align=right | 6.0 km || 
|-id=658 bgcolor=#E9E9E9
| 22658 ||  || — || August 17, 1998 || Socorro || LINEAR || WIT || align=right | 4.5 km || 
|-id=659 bgcolor=#d6d6d6
| 22659 ||  || — || August 17, 1998 || Socorro || LINEAR || EOS || align=right | 4.5 km || 
|-id=660 bgcolor=#d6d6d6
| 22660 ||  || — || August 17, 1998 || Socorro || LINEAR || EOS || align=right | 6.6 km || 
|-id=661 bgcolor=#fefefe
| 22661 ||  || — || August 17, 1998 || Socorro || LINEAR || — || align=right | 2.4 km || 
|-id=662 bgcolor=#d6d6d6
| 22662 ||  || — || August 17, 1998 || Socorro || LINEAR || HYG || align=right | 8.1 km || 
|-id=663 bgcolor=#E9E9E9
| 22663 ||  || — || August 17, 1998 || Socorro || LINEAR || — || align=right | 4.5 km || 
|-id=664 bgcolor=#d6d6d6
| 22664 ||  || — || August 17, 1998 || Socorro || LINEAR || HYG || align=right | 10 km || 
|-id=665 bgcolor=#d6d6d6
| 22665 ||  || — || August 17, 1998 || Socorro || LINEAR || HYG || align=right | 9.2 km || 
|-id=666 bgcolor=#fefefe
| 22666 Josephchurch ||  ||  || August 17, 1998 || Socorro || LINEAR || V || align=right | 3.4 km || 
|-id=667 bgcolor=#d6d6d6
| 22667 ||  || — || August 25, 1998 || Višnjan Observatory || Višnjan Obs. || — || align=right | 6.3 km || 
|-id=668 bgcolor=#fefefe
| 22668 ||  || — || August 26, 1998 || Višnjan Observatory || Višnjan Obs. || NYS || align=right | 3.0 km || 
|-id=669 bgcolor=#d6d6d6
| 22669 ||  || — || August 17, 1998 || Socorro || LINEAR || — || align=right | 5.1 km || 
|-id=670 bgcolor=#d6d6d6
| 22670 ||  || — || August 17, 1998 || Socorro || LINEAR || — || align=right | 5.1 km || 
|-id=671 bgcolor=#E9E9E9
| 22671 ||  || — || August 17, 1998 || Socorro || LINEAR || HOF || align=right | 11 km || 
|-id=672 bgcolor=#d6d6d6
| 22672 ||  || — || August 17, 1998 || Socorro || LINEAR || — || align=right | 9.4 km || 
|-id=673 bgcolor=#d6d6d6
| 22673 ||  || — || August 17, 1998 || Socorro || LINEAR || — || align=right | 17 km || 
|-id=674 bgcolor=#d6d6d6
| 22674 ||  || — || August 17, 1998 || Socorro || LINEAR || — || align=right | 9.3 km || 
|-id=675 bgcolor=#E9E9E9
| 22675 Davidcohn ||  ||  || August 17, 1998 || Socorro || LINEAR || — || align=right | 4.2 km || 
|-id=676 bgcolor=#E9E9E9
| 22676 ||  || — || August 17, 1998 || Socorro || LINEAR || — || align=right | 4.1 km || 
|-id=677 bgcolor=#d6d6d6
| 22677 ||  || — || August 17, 1998 || Socorro || LINEAR || EOS || align=right | 5.4 km || 
|-id=678 bgcolor=#d6d6d6
| 22678 ||  || — || August 17, 1998 || Socorro || LINEAR || VER || align=right | 6.9 km || 
|-id=679 bgcolor=#fefefe
| 22679 Amydavid ||  ||  || August 17, 1998 || Socorro || LINEAR || — || align=right | 2.8 km || 
|-id=680 bgcolor=#d6d6d6
| 22680 ||  || — || August 17, 1998 || Socorro || LINEAR || — || align=right | 14 km || 
|-id=681 bgcolor=#d6d6d6
| 22681 ||  || — || August 17, 1998 || Socorro || LINEAR || KOR || align=right | 4.6 km || 
|-id=682 bgcolor=#d6d6d6
| 22682 ||  || — || August 17, 1998 || Socorro || LINEAR || KOR || align=right | 5.7 km || 
|-id=683 bgcolor=#E9E9E9
| 22683 ||  || — || August 17, 1998 || Socorro || LINEAR || — || align=right | 4.5 km || 
|-id=684 bgcolor=#d6d6d6
| 22684 ||  || — || August 17, 1998 || Socorro || LINEAR || EOS || align=right | 6.8 km || 
|-id=685 bgcolor=#E9E9E9
| 22685 Dominguez ||  ||  || August 17, 1998 || Socorro || LINEAR || AGN || align=right | 4.1 km || 
|-id=686 bgcolor=#E9E9E9
| 22686 Mishchenko ||  ||  || August 20, 1998 || Anderson Mesa || LONEOS || — || align=right | 4.6 km || 
|-id=687 bgcolor=#E9E9E9
| 22687 ||  || — || August 24, 1998 || Socorro || LINEAR || MAR || align=right | 4.4 km || 
|-id=688 bgcolor=#E9E9E9
| 22688 ||  || — || August 24, 1998 || Socorro || LINEAR || EUN || align=right | 4.2 km || 
|-id=689 bgcolor=#d6d6d6
| 22689 ||  || — || August 24, 1998 || Socorro || LINEAR || — || align=right | 9.6 km || 
|-id=690 bgcolor=#E9E9E9
| 22690 ||  || — || August 19, 1998 || Socorro || LINEAR || — || align=right | 5.6 km || 
|-id=691 bgcolor=#d6d6d6
| 22691 ||  || — || August 26, 1998 || La Silla || E. W. Elst || KOR || align=right | 6.9 km || 
|-id=692 bgcolor=#d6d6d6
| 22692 Carfrekahl ||  ||  || August 26, 1998 || La Silla || E. W. Elst || 7:4 || align=right | 9.8 km || 
|-id=693 bgcolor=#E9E9E9
| 22693 ||  || — || August 26, 1998 || La Silla || E. W. Elst || AER || align=right | 5.5 km || 
|-id=694 bgcolor=#E9E9E9
| 22694 Tyndall ||  ||  || August 26, 1998 || La Silla || E. W. Elst || MAR || align=right | 6.4 km || 
|-id=695 bgcolor=#d6d6d6
| 22695 ||  || — || August 26, 1998 || La Silla || E. W. Elst || — || align=right | 8.6 km || 
|-id=696 bgcolor=#fefefe
| 22696 ||  || — || August 25, 1998 || La Silla || E. W. Elst || V || align=right | 3.1 km || 
|-id=697 bgcolor=#E9E9E9
| 22697 Mánek || 1998 RM ||  || September 7, 1998 || Ondřejov || L. Kotková || WAT || align=right | 8.0 km || 
|-id=698 bgcolor=#d6d6d6
| 22698 ||  || — || September 10, 1998 || Višnjan Observatory || Višnjan Obs. || — || align=right | 8.6 km || 
|-id=699 bgcolor=#d6d6d6
| 22699 ||  || — || September 14, 1998 || Socorro || LINEAR || SHU3:2 || align=right | 12 km || 
|-id=700 bgcolor=#d6d6d6
| 22700 ||  || — || September 14, 1998 || Socorro || LINEAR || HYG || align=right | 14 km || 
|}

22701–22800 

|-bgcolor=#fefefe
| 22701 Cyannaskye ||  ||  || September 14, 1998 || Socorro || LINEAR || — || align=right | 2.7 km || 
|-id=702 bgcolor=#d6d6d6
| 22702 ||  || — || September 14, 1998 || Socorro || LINEAR || — || align=right | 12 km || 
|-id=703 bgcolor=#d6d6d6
| 22703 ||  || — || September 14, 1998 || Socorro || LINEAR || HYG || align=right | 13 km || 
|-id=704 bgcolor=#d6d6d6
| 22704 ||  || — || September 14, 1998 || Socorro || LINEAR || — || align=right | 11 km || 
|-id=705 bgcolor=#d6d6d6
| 22705 Erinedwards ||  ||  || September 14, 1998 || Socorro || LINEAR || KOR || align=right | 5.8 km || 
|-id=706 bgcolor=#E9E9E9
| 22706 Ganguly ||  ||  || September 14, 1998 || Socorro || LINEAR || — || align=right | 3.5 km || 
|-id=707 bgcolor=#d6d6d6
| 22707 Jackgrundy ||  ||  || September 14, 1998 || Socorro || LINEAR || — || align=right | 8.9 km || 
|-id=708 bgcolor=#d6d6d6
| 22708 ||  || — || September 14, 1998 || Socorro || LINEAR || — || align=right | 5.7 km || 
|-id=709 bgcolor=#E9E9E9
| 22709 ||  || — || September 14, 1998 || Socorro || LINEAR || EUN || align=right | 5.1 km || 
|-id=710 bgcolor=#d6d6d6
| 22710 ||  || — || September 14, 1998 || Socorro || LINEAR || — || align=right | 6.5 km || 
|-id=711 bgcolor=#d6d6d6
| 22711 ||  || — || September 14, 1998 || Socorro || LINEAR || EOS || align=right | 7.0 km || 
|-id=712 bgcolor=#d6d6d6
| 22712 ||  || — || September 14, 1998 || Socorro || LINEAR || slow || align=right | 13 km || 
|-id=713 bgcolor=#d6d6d6
| 22713 ||  || — || September 14, 1998 || Socorro || LINEAR || — || align=right | 12 km || 
|-id=714 bgcolor=#d6d6d6
| 22714 ||  || — || September 18, 1998 || Catalina || CSS || Tj (2.99) || align=right | 16 km || 
|-id=715 bgcolor=#d6d6d6
| 22715 ||  || — || September 20, 1998 || Kitt Peak || Spacewatch || KOR || align=right | 4.4 km || 
|-id=716 bgcolor=#d6d6d6
| 22716 ||  || — || September 16, 1998 || Višnjan Observatory || Višnjan Obs. || THM || align=right | 11 km || 
|-id=717 bgcolor=#d6d6d6
| 22717 Romeuf ||  ||  || September 21, 1998 || Caussols || ODAS || — || align=right | 11 km || 
|-id=718 bgcolor=#d6d6d6
| 22718 ||  || — || September 16, 1998 || Kitt Peak || Spacewatch || — || align=right | 12 km || 
|-id=719 bgcolor=#E9E9E9
| 22719 Nakadori ||  ||  || September 22, 1998 || Anderson Mesa || LONEOS || PAD || align=right | 13 km || 
|-id=720 bgcolor=#d6d6d6
| 22720 ||  || — || September 24, 1998 || Višnjan Observatory || Višnjan Obs. || 7:4 || align=right | 15 km || 
|-id=721 bgcolor=#d6d6d6
| 22721 ||  || — || September 26, 1998 || Kitt Peak || Spacewatch || — || align=right | 11 km || 
|-id=722 bgcolor=#E9E9E9
| 22722 Timothycooper ||  ||  || September 16, 1998 || Anderson Mesa || LONEOS || — || align=right | 6.3 km || 
|-id=723 bgcolor=#E9E9E9
| 22723 Edlopez ||  ||  || September 17, 1998 || Anderson Mesa || LONEOS || — || align=right | 5.3 km || 
|-id=724 bgcolor=#d6d6d6
| 22724 Byatt ||  ||  || September 17, 1998 || Anderson Mesa || LONEOS || THM || align=right | 14 km || 
|-id=725 bgcolor=#fefefe
| 22725 Drabble ||  ||  || September 19, 1998 || Anderson Mesa || LONEOS || V || align=right | 3.6 km || 
|-id=726 bgcolor=#d6d6d6
| 22726 ||  || — || September 21, 1998 || La Silla || E. W. Elst || THM || align=right | 8.7 km || 
|-id=727 bgcolor=#d6d6d6
| 22727 ||  || — || September 26, 1998 || Socorro || LINEAR || — || align=right | 8.8 km || 
|-id=728 bgcolor=#d6d6d6
| 22728 ||  || — || September 26, 1998 || Socorro || LINEAR || — || align=right | 13 km || 
|-id=729 bgcolor=#fefefe
| 22729 Anthennig ||  ||  || September 26, 1998 || Socorro || LINEAR || — || align=right | 2.1 km || 
|-id=730 bgcolor=#E9E9E9
| 22730 Jacobhurwitz ||  ||  || September 26, 1998 || Socorro || LINEAR || — || align=right | 2.7 km || 
|-id=731 bgcolor=#d6d6d6
| 22731 ||  || — || September 26, 1998 || Socorro || LINEAR || EOS || align=right | 8.3 km || 
|-id=732 bgcolor=#d6d6d6
| 22732 Jakpor ||  ||  || September 26, 1998 || Socorro || LINEAR || THM || align=right | 8.5 km || 
|-id=733 bgcolor=#d6d6d6
| 22733 ||  || — || September 26, 1998 || Socorro || LINEAR || — || align=right | 8.7 km || 
|-id=734 bgcolor=#fefefe
| 22734 Theojones ||  ||  || September 26, 1998 || Socorro || LINEAR || NYS || align=right | 2.1 km || 
|-id=735 bgcolor=#d6d6d6
| 22735 ||  || — || September 26, 1998 || Socorro || LINEAR || — || align=right | 12 km || 
|-id=736 bgcolor=#fefefe
| 22736 Kamitaki ||  ||  || September 26, 1998 || Socorro || LINEAR || FLO || align=right | 3.3 km || 
|-id=737 bgcolor=#d6d6d6
| 22737 ||  || — || September 26, 1998 || Socorro || LINEAR || — || align=right | 11 km || 
|-id=738 bgcolor=#d6d6d6
| 22738 ||  || — || September 26, 1998 || Socorro || LINEAR || EOS || align=right | 7.8 km || 
|-id=739 bgcolor=#d6d6d6
| 22739 Sikhote-Alin ||  ||  || September 18, 1998 || La Silla || E. W. Elst || — || align=right | 4.3 km || 
|-id=740 bgcolor=#d6d6d6
| 22740 Rayleigh ||  ||  || September 20, 1998 || La Silla || E. W. Elst || 2:1J || align=right | 9.8 km || 
|-id=741 bgcolor=#E9E9E9
| 22741 ||  || — || September 26, 1998 || Socorro || LINEAR || — || align=right | 6.0 km || 
|-id=742 bgcolor=#E9E9E9
| 22742 ||  || — || October 15, 1998 || Višnjan Observatory || K. Korlević || — || align=right | 5.7 km || 
|-id=743 bgcolor=#d6d6d6
| 22743 ||  || — || October 13, 1998 || Xinglong || SCAP || — || align=right | 15 km || 
|-id=744 bgcolor=#d6d6d6
| 22744 Esterantonucci ||  ||  || October 14, 1998 || Anderson Mesa || LONEOS || — || align=right | 13 km || 
|-id=745 bgcolor=#E9E9E9
| 22745 Rikuzentakata ||  ||  || October 14, 1998 || Anderson Mesa || LONEOS || — || align=right | 4.9 km || 
|-id=746 bgcolor=#d6d6d6
| 22746 ||  || — || October 22, 1998 || Višnjan Observatory || K. Korlević || NAE || align=right | 7.6 km || 
|-id=747 bgcolor=#E9E9E9
| 22747 ||  || — || October 22, 1998 || Višnjan Observatory || K. Korlević || — || align=right | 5.2 km || 
|-id=748 bgcolor=#d6d6d6
| 22748 ||  || — || October 17, 1998 || Xinglong || SCAP || — || align=right | 8.7 km || 
|-id=749 bgcolor=#fefefe
| 22749 ||  || — || October 27, 1998 || Višnjan Observatory || K. Korlević || NYS || align=right | 1.8 km || 
|-id=750 bgcolor=#fefefe
| 22750 ||  || — || October 29, 1998 || Višnjan Observatory || K. Korlević || — || align=right | 3.0 km || 
|-id=751 bgcolor=#fefefe
| 22751 ||  || — || October 18, 1998 || La Silla || E. W. Elst || — || align=right | 4.4 km || 
|-id=752 bgcolor=#E9E9E9
| 22752 Sabrinamasiero ||  ||  || November 15, 1998 || San Marcello || A. Boattini, M. Tombelli || MAR || align=right | 4.5 km || 
|-id=753 bgcolor=#FFC2E0
| 22753 || 1998 WT || — || November 16, 1998 || Socorro || LINEAR || APO +1kmPHA || align=right | 1.1 km || 
|-id=754 bgcolor=#d6d6d6
| 22754 Olympus ||  ||  || November 26, 1998 || Reedy Creek || J. Broughton || — || align=right | 22 km || 
|-id=755 bgcolor=#fefefe
| 22755 ||  || — || November 28, 1998 || Višnjan Observatory || K. Korlević || — || align=right | 2.6 km || 
|-id=756 bgcolor=#fefefe
| 22756 Manpreetkaur ||  ||  || November 18, 1998 || Socorro || LINEAR || — || align=right | 3.8 km || 
|-id=757 bgcolor=#d6d6d6
| 22757 Klimcak ||  ||  || November 21, 1998 || Socorro || LINEAR || KOR || align=right | 4.1 km || 
|-id=758 bgcolor=#fefefe
| 22758 Lemp ||  ||  || November 21, 1998 || Socorro || LINEAR || — || align=right | 2.3 km || 
|-id=759 bgcolor=#fefefe
| 22759 ||  || — || December 11, 1998 || Oizumi || T. Kobayashi || — || align=right | 5.3 km || 
|-id=760 bgcolor=#E9E9E9
| 22760 ||  || — || December 12, 1998 || Oizumi || T. Kobayashi || WIT || align=right | 4.5 km || 
|-id=761 bgcolor=#fefefe
| 22761 ||  || — || December 16, 1998 || Woomera || F. B. Zoltowski || — || align=right | 3.8 km || 
|-id=762 bgcolor=#d6d6d6
| 22762 ||  || — || December 27, 1998 || Gekko || T. Kagawa || KOR || align=right | 4.8 km || 
|-id=763 bgcolor=#E9E9E9
| 22763 ||  || — || January 10, 1999 || Oizumi || T. Kobayashi || — || align=right | 3.7 km || 
|-id=764 bgcolor=#fefefe
| 22764 ||  || — || January 10, 1999 || Oizumi || T. Kobayashi || — || align=right | 2.5 km || 
|-id=765 bgcolor=#d6d6d6
| 22765 ||  || — || January 12, 1999 || Oizumi || T. Kobayashi || EOS || align=right | 7.4 km || 
|-id=766 bgcolor=#E9E9E9
| 22766 ||  || — || January 9, 1999 || Višnjan Observatory || K. Korlević || — || align=right | 4.8 km || 
|-id=767 bgcolor=#fefefe
| 22767 ||  || — || January 14, 1999 || Višnjan Observatory || K. Korlević || NYS || align=right | 4.2 km || 
|-id=768 bgcolor=#d6d6d6
| 22768 ||  || — || January 15, 1999 || Kitt Peak || Spacewatch || KOR || align=right | 4.3 km || 
|-id=769 bgcolor=#d6d6d6
| 22769 Aurelianora ||  ||  || January 19, 1999 || Gnosca || S. Sposetti || — || align=right | 11 km || 
|-id=770 bgcolor=#fefefe
| 22770 ||  || — || January 24, 1999 || Woomera || F. B. Zoltowski || V || align=right | 11 km || 
|-id=771 bgcolor=#FFC2E0
| 22771 ||  || — || February 10, 1999 || Socorro || LINEAR || APO +1km || align=right | 1.5 km || 
|-id=772 bgcolor=#d6d6d6
| 22772 ||  || — || February 10, 1999 || Socorro || LINEAR || KOR || align=right | 5.8 km || 
|-id=773 bgcolor=#d6d6d6
| 22773 ||  || — || February 10, 1999 || Socorro || LINEAR || THM || align=right | 8.8 km || 
|-id=774 bgcolor=#d6d6d6
| 22774 ||  || — || February 10, 1999 || Socorro || LINEAR || EOS || align=right | 7.5 km || 
|-id=775 bgcolor=#fefefe
| 22775 Jasonelloyd ||  ||  || February 10, 1999 || Socorro || LINEAR || V || align=right | 6.8 km || 
|-id=776 bgcolor=#fefefe
| 22776 Matossian ||  ||  || February 10, 1999 || Socorro || LINEAR || V || align=right | 3.2 km || 
|-id=777 bgcolor=#fefefe
| 22777 McAliley ||  ||  || February 10, 1999 || Socorro || LINEAR || NYS || align=right | 2.6 km || 
|-id=778 bgcolor=#d6d6d6
| 22778 ||  || — || February 12, 1999 || Socorro || LINEAR || — || align=right | 9.3 km || 
|-id=779 bgcolor=#d6d6d6
| 22779 ||  || — || March 19, 1999 || Socorro || LINEAR || — || align=right | 8.7 km || 
|-id=780 bgcolor=#fefefe
| 22780 McAlpine ||  ||  || March 20, 1999 || Socorro || LINEAR || FLO || align=right | 1.9 km || 
|-id=781 bgcolor=#fefefe
| 22781 ||  || — || April 10, 1999 || Višnjan Observatory || K. Korlević || FLO || align=right | 3.4 km || 
|-id=782 bgcolor=#fefefe
| 22782 Kushalnaik ||  ||  || April 15, 1999 || Socorro || LINEAR || FLO || align=right | 2.9 km || 
|-id=783 bgcolor=#E9E9E9
| 22783 Teng ||  ||  || April 11, 1999 || Anderson Mesa || LONEOS || — || align=right | 5.5 km || 
|-id=784 bgcolor=#fefefe
| 22784 Theresaoei ||  ||  || May 10, 1999 || Socorro || LINEAR || — || align=right | 4.7 km || 
|-id=785 bgcolor=#d6d6d6
| 22785 ||  || — || May 10, 1999 || Socorro || LINEAR || — || align=right | 7.2 km || 
|-id=786 bgcolor=#fefefe
| 22786 Willipete ||  ||  || May 12, 1999 || Socorro || LINEAR || — || align=right | 6.3 km || 
|-id=787 bgcolor=#E9E9E9
| 22787 ||  || — || May 14, 1999 || Socorro || LINEAR || — || align=right | 4.4 km || 
|-id=788 bgcolor=#fefefe
| 22788 von Steuben ||  ||  || May 15, 1999 || Anderson Mesa || LONEOS || — || align=right | 4.8 km || 
|-id=789 bgcolor=#fefefe
| 22789 ||  || — || May 18, 1999 || Kitt Peak || Spacewatch || — || align=right | 2.2 km || 
|-id=790 bgcolor=#fefefe
| 22790 ||  || — || May 20, 1999 || Socorro || LINEAR || H || align=right | 3.8 km || 
|-id=791 bgcolor=#fefefe
| 22791 Twarog ||  ||  || June 14, 1999 || Farpoint || G. Bell || — || align=right | 2.1 km || 
|-id=792 bgcolor=#fefefe
| 22792 || 1999 NU || — || July 7, 1999 || Višnjan Observatory || K. Korlević || V || align=right | 1.9 km || 
|-id=793 bgcolor=#fefefe
| 22793 ||  || — || July 12, 1999 || Socorro || LINEAR || PHO || align=right | 3.2 km || 
|-id=794 bgcolor=#fefefe
| 22794 Lindsayleona ||  ||  || July 13, 1999 || Socorro || LINEAR || fast? || align=right | 2.2 km || 
|-id=795 bgcolor=#fefefe
| 22795 ||  || — || July 14, 1999 || Socorro || LINEAR || NYS || align=right | 2.5 km || 
|-id=796 bgcolor=#d6d6d6
| 22796 ||  || — || July 14, 1999 || Socorro || LINEAR || EOS || align=right | 8.8 km || 
|-id=797 bgcolor=#fefefe
| 22797 ||  || — || July 14, 1999 || Socorro || LINEAR || NYS || align=right | 3.2 km || 
|-id=798 bgcolor=#d6d6d6
| 22798 ||  || — || July 14, 1999 || Socorro || LINEAR || EOS || align=right | 6.7 km || 
|-id=799 bgcolor=#fefefe
| 22799 ||  || — || July 14, 1999 || Socorro || LINEAR || FLO || align=right | 1.8 km || 
|-id=800 bgcolor=#fefefe
| 22800 ||  || — || July 14, 1999 || Socorro || LINEAR || — || align=right | 3.1 km || 
|}

22801–22900 

|-bgcolor=#fefefe
| 22801 ||  || — || July 14, 1999 || Socorro || LINEAR || — || align=right | 4.4 km || 
|-id=802 bgcolor=#fefefe
| 22802 Sigiriya ||  ||  || August 13, 1999 || Anderson Mesa || LONEOS || FLO || align=right | 2.5 km || 
|-id=803 bgcolor=#E9E9E9
| 22803 || 1999 RV || — || September 4, 1999 || Catalina || CSS || — || align=right | 4.9 km || 
|-id=804 bgcolor=#fefefe
| 22804 ||  || — || September 6, 1999 || Višnjan Observatory || K. Korlević || MAS || align=right | 2.4 km || 
|-id=805 bgcolor=#d6d6d6
| 22805 ||  || — || September 6, 1999 || Catalina || CSS || — || align=right | 16 km || 
|-id=806 bgcolor=#fefefe
| 22806 ||  || — || September 4, 1999 || Catalina || CSS || FLO || align=right | 1.9 km || 
|-id=807 bgcolor=#FA8072
| 22807 ||  || — || September 3, 1999 || Kitt Peak || Spacewatch || — || align=right | 2.6 km || 
|-id=808 bgcolor=#C2FFFF
| 22808 ||  || — || September 7, 1999 || Socorro || LINEAR || L5 || align=right | 21 km || 
|-id=809 bgcolor=#fefefe
| 22809 Kensiequade ||  ||  || September 7, 1999 || Socorro || LINEAR || NYS || align=right | 2.7 km || 
|-id=810 bgcolor=#fefefe
| 22810 Rawat ||  ||  || September 7, 1999 || Socorro || LINEAR || — || align=right | 2.3 km || 
|-id=811 bgcolor=#fefefe
| 22811 ||  || — || September 7, 1999 || Socorro || LINEAR || — || align=right | 1.6 km || 
|-id=812 bgcolor=#fefefe
| 22812 Ricker ||  ||  || September 7, 1999 || Socorro || LINEAR || NYSslow || align=right | 5.1 km || 
|-id=813 bgcolor=#E9E9E9
| 22813 ||  || — || September 7, 1999 || Socorro || LINEAR || — || align=right | 3.2 km || 
|-id=814 bgcolor=#fefefe
| 22814 ||  || — || September 7, 1999 || Socorro || LINEAR || NYS || align=right | 2.1 km || 
|-id=815 bgcolor=#fefefe
| 22815 Sewell ||  ||  || September 7, 1999 || Socorro || LINEAR || V || align=right | 1.8 km || 
|-id=816 bgcolor=#fefefe
| 22816 ||  || — || September 7, 1999 || Socorro || LINEAR || NYS || align=right | 1.5 km || 
|-id=817 bgcolor=#E9E9E9
| 22817 Shankar ||  ||  || September 7, 1999 || Socorro || LINEAR || — || align=right | 5.3 km || 
|-id=818 bgcolor=#fefefe
| 22818 ||  || — || September 7, 1999 || Socorro || LINEAR || — || align=right | 2.5 km || 
|-id=819 bgcolor=#fefefe
| 22819 Davidtao ||  ||  || September 7, 1999 || Socorro || LINEAR || — || align=right | 2.3 km || 
|-id=820 bgcolor=#E9E9E9
| 22820 ||  || — || September 9, 1999 || Višnjan Observatory || K. Korlević || — || align=right | 3.2 km || 
|-id=821 bgcolor=#fefefe
| 22821 ||  || — || September 2, 1999 || Eskridge || G. Bell, G. Hug || FLO || align=right | 1.8 km || 
|-id=822 bgcolor=#fefefe
| 22822 ||  || — || September 12, 1999 || Višnjan Observatory || K. Korlević || — || align=right | 2.9 km || 
|-id=823 bgcolor=#fefefe
| 22823 ||  || — || September 13, 1999 || Višnjan Observatory || K. Korlević || — || align=right | 3.7 km || 
|-id=824 bgcolor=#fefefe
| 22824 von Neumann ||  ||  || September 12, 1999 || Ondřejov || P. Pravec, P. Kušnirák || — || align=right | 2.3 km || 
|-id=825 bgcolor=#fefefe
| 22825 ||  || — || September 13, 1999 || Zeno || T. Stafford || — || align=right | 2.7 km || 
|-id=826 bgcolor=#d6d6d6
| 22826 ||  || — || September 14, 1999 || Višnjan Observatory || K. Korlević || EOS || align=right | 6.9 km || 
|-id=827 bgcolor=#fefefe
| 22827 Arvernia ||  ||  || September 8, 1999 || Uccle || T. Pauwels || V || align=right | 2.1 km || 
|-id=828 bgcolor=#E9E9E9
| 22828 Jaynethomp ||  ||  || September 7, 1999 || Socorro || LINEAR || — || align=right | 5.4 km || 
|-id=829 bgcolor=#fefefe
| 22829 Paigerin ||  ||  || September 7, 1999 || Socorro || LINEAR || NYS || align=right | 2.9 km || 
|-id=830 bgcolor=#d6d6d6
| 22830 Tinker ||  ||  || September 7, 1999 || Socorro || LINEAR || — || align=right | 7.8 km || 
|-id=831 bgcolor=#d6d6d6
| 22831 Trevanvoorth ||  ||  || September 7, 1999 || Socorro || LINEAR || EOS || align=right | 4.9 km || 
|-id=832 bgcolor=#fefefe
| 22832 ||  || — || September 7, 1999 || Socorro || LINEAR || — || align=right | 5.8 km || 
|-id=833 bgcolor=#fefefe
| 22833 Scottyu ||  ||  || September 7, 1999 || Socorro || LINEAR || — || align=right | 2.9 km || 
|-id=834 bgcolor=#fefefe
| 22834 ||  || — || September 7, 1999 || Socorro || LINEAR || FLO || align=right | 2.4 km || 
|-id=835 bgcolor=#E9E9E9
| 22835 Rickgardner ||  ||  || September 7, 1999 || Socorro || LINEAR || — || align=right | 3.0 km || 
|-id=836 bgcolor=#E9E9E9
| 22836 Leeannragasa ||  ||  || September 7, 1999 || Socorro || LINEAR || — || align=right | 2.5 km || 
|-id=837 bgcolor=#fefefe
| 22837 Richardcruz ||  ||  || September 7, 1999 || Socorro || LINEAR || — || align=right | 2.8 km || 
|-id=838 bgcolor=#E9E9E9
| 22838 Darcyhampton ||  ||  || September 7, 1999 || Socorro || LINEAR || HOF || align=right | 7.9 km || 
|-id=839 bgcolor=#fefefe
| 22839 Richlawrence ||  ||  || September 7, 1999 || Socorro || LINEAR || — || align=right | 2.0 km || 
|-id=840 bgcolor=#E9E9E9
| 22840 Villarreal ||  ||  || September 7, 1999 || Socorro || LINEAR || WIT || align=right | 3.6 km || 
|-id=841 bgcolor=#E9E9E9
| 22841 ||  || — || September 8, 1999 || Socorro || LINEAR || — || align=right | 4.4 km || 
|-id=842 bgcolor=#E9E9E9
| 22842 Alenashort ||  ||  || September 8, 1999 || Socorro || LINEAR || — || align=right | 2.6 km || 
|-id=843 bgcolor=#E9E9E9
| 22843 Stverak ||  ||  || September 8, 1999 || Socorro || LINEAR || — || align=right | 9.0 km || 
|-id=844 bgcolor=#FA8072
| 22844 ||  || — || September 9, 1999 || Socorro || LINEAR || Tj (2.98) || align=right | 6.7 km || 
|-id=845 bgcolor=#d6d6d6
| 22845 ||  || — || September 9, 1999 || Socorro || LINEAR || — || align=right | 9.9 km || 
|-id=846 bgcolor=#fefefe
| 22846 Fredwhitaker ||  ||  || September 9, 1999 || Socorro || LINEAR || — || align=right | 2.2 km || 
|-id=847 bgcolor=#E9E9E9
| 22847 Utley ||  ||  || September 9, 1999 || Socorro || LINEAR || — || align=right | 2.3 km || 
|-id=848 bgcolor=#fefefe
| 22848 Chrisharriot ||  ||  || September 9, 1999 || Socorro || LINEAR || NYS || align=right | 4.4 km || 
|-id=849 bgcolor=#E9E9E9
| 22849 ||  || — || September 9, 1999 || Socorro || LINEAR || — || align=right | 5.1 km || 
|-id=850 bgcolor=#E9E9E9
| 22850 ||  || — || September 9, 1999 || Socorro || LINEAR || PAE || align=right | 8.1 km || 
|-id=851 bgcolor=#fefefe
| 22851 ||  || — || September 9, 1999 || Socorro || LINEAR || NYS || align=right | 2.7 km || 
|-id=852 bgcolor=#fefefe
| 22852 Kinney ||  ||  || September 9, 1999 || Socorro || LINEAR || FLO || align=right | 2.2 km || 
|-id=853 bgcolor=#fefefe
| 22853 ||  || — || September 9, 1999 || Socorro || LINEAR || NYS || align=right | 2.1 km || 
|-id=854 bgcolor=#E9E9E9
| 22854 ||  || — || September 9, 1999 || Socorro || LINEAR || EUN || align=right | 2.5 km || 
|-id=855 bgcolor=#E9E9E9
| 22855 Donnajones ||  ||  || September 9, 1999 || Socorro || LINEAR || — || align=right | 3.1 km || 
|-id=856 bgcolor=#E9E9E9
| 22856 Stevenzeiher ||  ||  || September 9, 1999 || Socorro || LINEAR || — || align=right | 2.2 km || 
|-id=857 bgcolor=#fefefe
| 22857 Hyde ||  ||  || September 9, 1999 || Socorro || LINEAR || — || align=right | 2.5 km || 
|-id=858 bgcolor=#fefefe
| 22858 Suesong ||  ||  || September 9, 1999 || Socorro || LINEAR || V || align=right | 1.7 km || 
|-id=859 bgcolor=#fefefe
| 22859 ||  || — || September 9, 1999 || Socorro || LINEAR || FLO || align=right | 2.4 km || 
|-id=860 bgcolor=#fefefe
| 22860 Francylemp ||  ||  || September 9, 1999 || Socorro || LINEAR || MAS || align=right | 2.3 km || 
|-id=861 bgcolor=#fefefe
| 22861 ||  || — || September 9, 1999 || Socorro || LINEAR || FLO || align=right | 1.6 km || 
|-id=862 bgcolor=#fefefe
| 22862 Janinedavis ||  ||  || September 9, 1999 || Socorro || LINEAR || — || align=right | 1.8 km || 
|-id=863 bgcolor=#E9E9E9
| 22863 Namarkarian ||  ||  || September 9, 1999 || Socorro || LINEAR || — || align=right | 2.6 km || 
|-id=864 bgcolor=#d6d6d6
| 22864 ||  || — || September 9, 1999 || Socorro || LINEAR || THM || align=right | 14 km || 
|-id=865 bgcolor=#d6d6d6
| 22865 Amymoffett ||  ||  || September 9, 1999 || Socorro || LINEAR || — || align=right | 8.3 km || 
|-id=866 bgcolor=#E9E9E9
| 22866 ||  || — || September 9, 1999 || Socorro || LINEAR || — || align=right | 2.7 km || 
|-id=867 bgcolor=#d6d6d6
| 22867 ||  || — || September 9, 1999 || Socorro || LINEAR || EOS || align=right | 6.6 km || 
|-id=868 bgcolor=#E9E9E9
| 22868 Karst ||  ||  || September 9, 1999 || Socorro || LINEAR || — || align=right | 4.7 km || 
|-id=869 bgcolor=#E9E9E9
| 22869 Brianmcfar ||  ||  || September 10, 1999 || Socorro || LINEAR || — || align=right | 3.6 km || 
|-id=870 bgcolor=#E9E9E9
| 22870 Rosing ||  ||  || September 14, 1999 || Fountain Hills || C. W. Juels || EUN || align=right | 9.3 km || 
|-id=871 bgcolor=#fefefe
| 22871 Ellenoei ||  ||  || September 7, 1999 || Socorro || LINEAR || — || align=right | 2.7 km || 
|-id=872 bgcolor=#fefefe
| 22872 Williamweber ||  ||  || September 7, 1999 || Socorro || LINEAR || FLO || align=right | 2.1 km || 
|-id=873 bgcolor=#fefefe
| 22873 Heatherholt ||  ||  || September 7, 1999 || Socorro || LINEAR || — || align=right | 2.4 km || 
|-id=874 bgcolor=#fefefe
| 22874 Haydeephelps ||  ||  || September 8, 1999 || Socorro || LINEAR || V || align=right | 2.9 km || 
|-id=875 bgcolor=#fefefe
| 22875 Lanejackson ||  ||  || September 8, 1999 || Socorro || LINEAR || — || align=right | 2.1 km || 
|-id=876 bgcolor=#fefefe
| 22876 ||  || — || September 9, 1999 || Socorro || LINEAR || — || align=right | 3.5 km || 
|-id=877 bgcolor=#fefefe
| 22877 Reginamiller ||  ||  || September 8, 1999 || Socorro || LINEAR || FLO || align=right | 2.8 km || 
|-id=878 bgcolor=#E9E9E9
| 22878 ||  || — || September 8, 1999 || Socorro || LINEAR || ADE || align=right | 6.4 km || 
|-id=879 bgcolor=#E9E9E9
| 22879 ||  || — || September 8, 1999 || Socorro || LINEAR || EUN || align=right | 3.3 km || 
|-id=880 bgcolor=#fefefe
| 22880 Pulaski ||  ||  || September 7, 1999 || Anderson Mesa || LONEOS || — || align=right | 2.5 km || 
|-id=881 bgcolor=#d6d6d6
| 22881 ||  || — || September 5, 1999 || Kitt Peak || Spacewatch || — || align=right | 4.6 km || 
|-id=882 bgcolor=#E9E9E9
| 22882 ||  || — || September 8, 1999 || Catalina || CSS || EUN || align=right | 3.5 km || 
|-id=883 bgcolor=#E9E9E9
| 22883 ||  || — || September 8, 1999 || Catalina || CSS || — || align=right | 5.1 km || 
|-id=884 bgcolor=#fefefe
| 22884 ||  || — || September 8, 1999 || Catalina || CSS || V || align=right | 1.8 km || 
|-id=885 bgcolor=#fefefe
| 22885 Sakaemura ||  ||  || September 8, 1999 || Anderson Mesa || LONEOS || V || align=right | 2.1 km || 
|-id=886 bgcolor=#E9E9E9
| 22886 ||  || — || September 18, 1999 || Socorro || LINEAR || — || align=right | 5.5 km || 
|-id=887 bgcolor=#fefefe
| 22887 ||  || — || September 29, 1999 || Višnjan Observatory || K. Korlević || — || align=right | 2.4 km || 
|-id=888 bgcolor=#d6d6d6
| 22888 ||  || — || September 29, 1999 || Višnjan Observatory || K. Korlević || — || align=right | 9.9 km || 
|-id=889 bgcolor=#E9E9E9
| 22889 Donnablaney ||  ||  || September 29, 1999 || Socorro || LINEAR || — || align=right | 3.0 km || 
|-id=890 bgcolor=#fefefe
| 22890 Ruthaellis ||  ||  || September 29, 1999 || Socorro || LINEAR || — || align=right | 2.7 km || 
|-id=891 bgcolor=#fefefe
| 22891 ||  || — || September 30, 1999 || Catalina || CSS || — || align=right | 2.6 km || 
|-id=892 bgcolor=#fefefe
| 22892 ||  || — || September 29, 1999 || Catalina || CSS || — || align=right | 2.4 km || 
|-id=893 bgcolor=#E9E9E9
| 22893 ||  || — || September 30, 1999 || Socorro || LINEAR || — || align=right | 2.9 km || 
|-id=894 bgcolor=#fefefe
| 22894 || 1999 TW || — || October 1, 1999 || Višnjan Observatory || K. Korlević || — || align=right | 3.2 km || 
|-id=895 bgcolor=#E9E9E9
| 22895 ||  || — || October 6, 1999 || High Point || D. K. Chesney || ADE || align=right | 4.7 km || 
|-id=896 bgcolor=#fefefe
| 22896 ||  || — || October 6, 1999 || Višnjan Observatory || K. Korlević, M. Jurić || — || align=right | 2.7 km || 
|-id=897 bgcolor=#fefefe
| 22897 ||  || — || October 6, 1999 || Višnjan Observatory || K. Korlević, M. Jurić || V || align=right | 3.5 km || 
|-id=898 bgcolor=#d6d6d6
| 22898 Falce ||  ||  || October 10, 1999 || Gnosca || S. Sposetti || — || align=right | 7.1 km || 
|-id=899 bgcolor=#d6d6d6
| 22899 Alconrad ||  ||  || October 11, 1999 || Višnjan Observatory || K. Korlević, M. Jurić || KORmoon || align=right | 5.7 km || 
|-id=900 bgcolor=#E9E9E9
| 22900 Trudie ||  ||  || October 11, 1999 || Fountain Hills || C. W. Juels || — || align=right | 4.5 km || 
|}

22901–23000 

|-bgcolor=#E9E9E9
| 22901 Ivanbella ||  ||  || October 12, 1999 || Ondřejov || P. Kušnirák, P. Pravec || — || align=right | 4.3 km || 
|-id=902 bgcolor=#d6d6d6
| 22902 ||  || — || October 15, 1999 || Višnjan Observatory || K. Korlević || KOR || align=right | 4.8 km || 
|-id=903 bgcolor=#fefefe
| 22903 Georgeclooney ||  ||  || October 14, 1999 || Monte Agliale || S. Donati || PHO || align=right | 3.7 km || 
|-id=904 bgcolor=#E9E9E9
| 22904 ||  || — || October 9, 1999 || Uto || F. Uto || — || align=right | 6.7 km || 
|-id=905 bgcolor=#fefefe
| 22905 Liciniotoso ||  ||  || October 14, 1999 || Farra d'Isonzo || Farra d'Isonzo || FLOslow || align=right | 2.6 km || 
|-id=906 bgcolor=#fefefe
| 22906 Lisauckis ||  ||  || October 3, 1999 || Socorro || LINEAR || — || align=right | 2.6 km || 
|-id=907 bgcolor=#d6d6d6
| 22907 van Voorthuijsen ||  ||  || October 3, 1999 || Socorro || LINEAR || — || align=right | 7.8 km || 
|-id=908 bgcolor=#fefefe
| 22908 Bayefsky-Anand ||  ||  || October 3, 1999 || Socorro || LINEAR || V || align=right | 3.4 km || 
|-id=909 bgcolor=#E9E9E9
| 22909 Gongmyunglee ||  ||  || October 4, 1999 || Socorro || LINEAR || — || align=right | 3.0 km || 
|-id=910 bgcolor=#fefefe
| 22910 Ruiwang ||  ||  || October 4, 1999 || Socorro || LINEAR || — || align=right | 4.5 km || 
|-id=911 bgcolor=#fefefe
| 22911 Johnpardon ||  ||  || October 4, 1999 || Socorro || LINEAR || — || align=right | 2.5 km || 
|-id=912 bgcolor=#E9E9E9
| 22912 Noraxu ||  ||  || October 4, 1999 || Socorro || LINEAR || — || align=right | 2.9 km || 
|-id=913 bgcolor=#E9E9E9
| 22913 Brockman ||  ||  || October 4, 1999 || Socorro || LINEAR || — || align=right | 4.6 km || 
|-id=914 bgcolor=#d6d6d6
| 22914 Tsunanmachi ||  ||  || October 13, 1999 || Anderson Mesa || LONEOS || — || align=right | 5.4 km || 
|-id=915 bgcolor=#d6d6d6
| 22915 ||  || — || October 3, 1999 || Catalina || CSS || EOS || align=right | 6.8 km || 
|-id=916 bgcolor=#E9E9E9
| 22916 ||  || — || October 5, 1999 || Catalina || CSS || EUN || align=right | 2.9 km || 
|-id=917 bgcolor=#fefefe
| 22917 ||  || — || October 10, 1999 || Kitt Peak || Spacewatch || — || align=right | 2.5 km || 
|-id=918 bgcolor=#E9E9E9
| 22918 ||  || — || October 11, 1999 || Kitt Peak || Spacewatch || — || align=right | 2.9 km || 
|-id=919 bgcolor=#fefefe
| 22919 Shuwan ||  ||  || October 2, 1999 || Socorro || LINEAR || — || align=right | 2.7 km || 
|-id=920 bgcolor=#d6d6d6
| 22920 Kaitduncan ||  ||  || October 2, 1999 || Socorro || LINEAR || KOR || align=right | 4.8 km || 
|-id=921 bgcolor=#fefefe
| 22921 Siyuanliu ||  ||  || October 2, 1999 || Socorro || LINEAR || — || align=right | 2.5 km || 
|-id=922 bgcolor=#fefefe
| 22922 Sophiecai ||  ||  || October 2, 1999 || Socorro || LINEAR || V || align=right | 1.8 km || 
|-id=923 bgcolor=#fefefe
| 22923 Kathrynblair ||  ||  || October 2, 1999 || Socorro || LINEAR || FLO || align=right | 2.0 km || 
|-id=924 bgcolor=#E9E9E9
| 22924 Deshpande ||  ||  || October 2, 1999 || Socorro || LINEAR || PAE || align=right | 11 km || 
|-id=925 bgcolor=#E9E9E9
| 22925 ||  || — || October 3, 1999 || Socorro || LINEAR || — || align=right | 2.8 km || 
|-id=926 bgcolor=#E9E9E9
| 22926 ||  || — || October 4, 1999 || Socorro || LINEAR || — || align=right | 4.4 km || 
|-id=927 bgcolor=#fefefe
| 22927 Blewett ||  ||  || October 4, 1999 || Socorro || LINEAR || — || align=right | 2.9 km || 
|-id=928 bgcolor=#fefefe
| 22928 Templehe ||  ||  || October 15, 1999 || Socorro || LINEAR || NYS || align=right | 2.4 km || 
|-id=929 bgcolor=#E9E9E9
| 22929 Seanwahl ||  ||  || October 4, 1999 || Socorro || LINEAR || — || align=right | 3.2 km || 
|-id=930 bgcolor=#fefefe
| 22930 ||  || — || October 5, 1999 || Socorro || LINEAR || FLO || align=right | 1.8 km || 
|-id=931 bgcolor=#d6d6d6
| 22931 ||  || — || October 6, 1999 || Socorro || LINEAR || — || align=right | 11 km || 
|-id=932 bgcolor=#E9E9E9
| 22932 Orenbrecher ||  ||  || October 6, 1999 || Socorro || LINEAR || — || align=right | 4.4 km || 
|-id=933 bgcolor=#E9E9E9
| 22933 Mareverett ||  ||  || October 7, 1999 || Socorro || LINEAR || — || align=right | 3.6 km || 
|-id=934 bgcolor=#d6d6d6
| 22934 ||  || — || October 7, 1999 || Socorro || LINEAR || THM || align=right | 7.7 km || 
|-id=935 bgcolor=#d6d6d6
| 22935 ||  || — || October 7, 1999 || Socorro || LINEAR || THM || align=right | 8.3 km || 
|-id=936 bgcolor=#d6d6d6
| 22936 Ricmccutchen ||  ||  || October 10, 1999 || Socorro || LINEAR || CHA || align=right | 6.0 km || 
|-id=937 bgcolor=#fefefe
| 22937 Nataliavella ||  ||  || October 10, 1999 || Socorro || LINEAR || — || align=right | 2.2 km || 
|-id=938 bgcolor=#d6d6d6
| 22938 Brilawrence ||  ||  || October 10, 1999 || Socorro || LINEAR || THM || align=right | 4.6 km || 
|-id=939 bgcolor=#d6d6d6
| 22939 Handlin ||  ||  || October 10, 1999 || Socorro || LINEAR || KOR || align=right | 3.5 km || 
|-id=940 bgcolor=#fefefe
| 22940 Chyan ||  ||  || October 10, 1999 || Socorro || LINEAR || NYS || align=right | 4.3 km || 
|-id=941 bgcolor=#fefefe
| 22941 ||  || — || October 12, 1999 || Socorro || LINEAR || — || align=right | 2.7 km || 
|-id=942 bgcolor=#E9E9E9
| 22942 Alexacourtis ||  ||  || October 13, 1999 || Socorro || LINEAR || — || align=right | 3.7 km || 
|-id=943 bgcolor=#d6d6d6
| 22943 ||  || — || October 14, 1999 || Socorro || LINEAR || HYG || align=right | 7.0 km || 
|-id=944 bgcolor=#fefefe
| 22944 Sarahmarzen ||  ||  || October 15, 1999 || Socorro || LINEAR || — || align=right | 2.3 km || 
|-id=945 bgcolor=#fefefe
| 22945 Schikowski ||  ||  || October 15, 1999 || Socorro || LINEAR || — || align=right | 3.0 km || 
|-id=946 bgcolor=#d6d6d6
| 22946 ||  || — || October 15, 1999 || Socorro || LINEAR || — || align=right | 8.3 km || 
|-id=947 bgcolor=#fefefe
| 22947 Carolsuh ||  ||  || October 15, 1999 || Socorro || LINEAR || NYS || align=right | 2.3 km || 
|-id=948 bgcolor=#E9E9E9
| 22948 Maidanak ||  ||  || October 2, 1999 || Anderson Mesa || LONEOS || MAR || align=right | 2.6 km || 
|-id=949 bgcolor=#fefefe
| 22949 ||  || — || October 4, 1999 || Catalina || CSS || — || align=right | 2.3 km || 
|-id=950 bgcolor=#fefefe
| 22950 ||  || — || October 4, 1999 || Catalina || CSS || V || align=right | 1.8 km || 
|-id=951 bgcolor=#d6d6d6
| 22951 Okabekazuko ||  ||  || October 4, 1999 || Anderson Mesa || LONEOS || — || align=right | 14 km || 
|-id=952 bgcolor=#E9E9E9
| 22952 Hommasachi ||  ||  || October 5, 1999 || Anderson Mesa || LONEOS || — || align=right | 6.9 km || 
|-id=953 bgcolor=#E9E9E9
| 22953 ||  || — || October 7, 1999 || Catalina || CSS || GEF || align=right | 5.1 km || 
|-id=954 bgcolor=#E9E9E9
| 22954 ||  || — || October 8, 1999 || Catalina || CSS || — || align=right | 6.7 km || 
|-id=955 bgcolor=#E9E9E9
| 22955 ||  || — || October 7, 1999 || Catalina || CSS || — || align=right | 16 km || 
|-id=956 bgcolor=#fefefe
| 22956 ||  || — || October 9, 1999 || Socorro || LINEAR || FLO || align=right | 2.0 km || 
|-id=957 bgcolor=#fefefe
| 22957 Vaintrob ||  ||  || October 3, 1999 || Socorro || LINEAR || — || align=right | 1.9 km || 
|-id=958 bgcolor=#d6d6d6
| 22958 Rohatgi ||  ||  || October 10, 1999 || Socorro || LINEAR || — || align=right | 6.9 km || 
|-id=959 bgcolor=#fefefe
| 22959 ||  || — || October 16, 1999 || Fountain Hills || C. W. Juels || — || align=right | 4.3 km || 
|-id=960 bgcolor=#fefefe
| 22960 ||  || — || October 27, 1999 || Višnjan Observatory || K. Korlević || FLO || align=right | 3.0 km || 
|-id=961 bgcolor=#fefefe
| 22961 ||  || — || October 29, 1999 || Catalina || CSS || NYS || align=right | 2.7 km || 
|-id=962 bgcolor=#d6d6d6
| 22962 ||  || — || October 29, 1999 || Catalina || CSS || — || align=right | 6.4 km || 
|-id=963 bgcolor=#fefefe
| 22963 ||  || — || October 28, 1999 || Catalina || CSS || FLO || align=right | 2.4 km || 
|-id=964 bgcolor=#fefefe
| 22964 ||  || — || October 31, 1999 || Kitt Peak || Spacewatch || — || align=right | 6.3 km || 
|-id=965 bgcolor=#d6d6d6
| 22965 ||  || — || October 16, 1999 || Socorro || LINEAR || HYG || align=right | 9.1 km || 
|-id=966 bgcolor=#fefefe
| 22966 ||  || — || October 31, 1999 || Catalina || CSS || V || align=right | 2.3 km || 
|-id=967 bgcolor=#E9E9E9
| 22967 ||  || — || November 1, 1999 || Catalina || CSS || DOR || align=right | 7.5 km || 
|-id=968 bgcolor=#d6d6d6
| 22968 ||  || — || November 5, 1999 || Višnjan Observatory || K. Korlević || KOR || align=right | 3.4 km || 
|-id=969 bgcolor=#d6d6d6
| 22969 ||  || — || November 5, 1999 || Oizumi || T. Kobayashi || THM || align=right | 8.7 km || 
|-id=970 bgcolor=#d6d6d6
| 22970 ||  || — || November 8, 1999 || Fountain Hills || C. W. Juels || MEL || align=right | 7.9 km || 
|-id=971 bgcolor=#fefefe
| 22971 ||  || — || November 9, 1999 || Fountain Hills || C. W. Juels || KLI || align=right | 7.1 km || 
|-id=972 bgcolor=#d6d6d6
| 22972 ||  || — || November 11, 1999 || Fountain Hills || C. W. Juels || EOS || align=right | 12 km || 
|-id=973 bgcolor=#E9E9E9
| 22973 ||  || — || November 2, 1999 || Kitt Peak || Spacewatch || — || align=right | 3.9 km || 
|-id=974 bgcolor=#E9E9E9
| 22974 ||  || — || November 12, 1999 || Višnjan Observatory || K. Korlević || — || align=right | 4.0 km || 
|-id=975 bgcolor=#fefefe
| 22975 ||  || — || November 14, 1999 || Fountain Hills || C. W. Juels || — || align=right | 2.9 km || 
|-id=976 bgcolor=#E9E9E9
| 22976 ||  || — || November 13, 1999 || Kashihara || F. Uto || — || align=right | 9.6 km || 
|-id=977 bgcolor=#E9E9E9
| 22977 ||  || — || November 15, 1999 || Fountain Hills || C. W. Juels || — || align=right | 6.7 km || 
|-id=978 bgcolor=#E9E9E9
| 22978 Nyrola ||  ||  || November 14, 1999 || Nyrölä || Nyrölä || ADE || align=right | 11 km || 
|-id=979 bgcolor=#fefefe
| 22979 ||  || — || November 13, 1999 || Oizumi || T. Kobayashi || — || align=right | 4.4 km || 
|-id=980 bgcolor=#fefefe
| 22980 ||  || — || November 3, 1999 || Catalina || CSS || — || align=right | 3.1 km || 
|-id=981 bgcolor=#fefefe
| 22981 Katz ||  ||  || November 3, 1999 || Socorro || LINEAR || — || align=right | 3.7 km || 
|-id=982 bgcolor=#d6d6d6
| 22982 Emmacall ||  ||  || November 3, 1999 || Socorro || LINEAR || KOR || align=right | 4.2 km || 
|-id=983 bgcolor=#d6d6d6
| 22983 Schlingheyde ||  ||  || November 3, 1999 || Socorro || LINEAR || KOR || align=right | 3.3 km || 
|-id=984 bgcolor=#d6d6d6
| 22984 ||  || — || November 3, 1999 || Socorro || LINEAR || THM || align=right | 11 km || 
|-id=985 bgcolor=#E9E9E9
| 22985 ||  || — || November 3, 1999 || Socorro || LINEAR || EUN || align=right | 3.6 km || 
|-id=986 bgcolor=#d6d6d6
| 22986 ||  || — || November 3, 1999 || Socorro || LINEAR || THM || align=right | 6.4 km || 
|-id=987 bgcolor=#d6d6d6
| 22987 Rebeckaufman ||  ||  || November 4, 1999 || Socorro || LINEAR || KOR || align=right | 3.3 km || 
|-id=988 bgcolor=#fefefe
| 22988 Jimmyhom ||  ||  || November 4, 1999 || Socorro || LINEAR || NYS || align=right | 2.2 km || 
|-id=989 bgcolor=#d6d6d6
| 22989 Loriskopp ||  ||  || November 4, 1999 || Socorro || LINEAR || — || align=right | 4.2 km || 
|-id=990 bgcolor=#E9E9E9
| 22990 Mattbrenner ||  ||  || November 4, 1999 || Socorro || LINEAR || MIS || align=right | 2.5 km || 
|-id=991 bgcolor=#fefefe
| 22991 Jeffreyklus ||  ||  || November 4, 1999 || Socorro || LINEAR || — || align=right | 2.5 km || 
|-id=992 bgcolor=#d6d6d6
| 22992 Susansmith ||  ||  || November 4, 1999 || Socorro || LINEAR || — || align=right | 6.8 km || 
|-id=993 bgcolor=#E9E9E9
| 22993 Aferrari ||  ||  || November 4, 1999 || Socorro || LINEAR || — || align=right | 4.1 km || 
|-id=994 bgcolor=#d6d6d6
| 22994 Workman ||  ||  || November 4, 1999 || Socorro || LINEAR || KOR || align=right | 3.8 km || 
|-id=995 bgcolor=#E9E9E9
| 22995 Allenjanes ||  ||  || November 4, 1999 || Socorro || LINEAR || — || align=right | 6.1 km || 
|-id=996 bgcolor=#d6d6d6
| 22996 De Boo ||  ||  || November 4, 1999 || Socorro || LINEAR || KOR || align=right | 3.5 km || 
|-id=997 bgcolor=#d6d6d6
| 22997 ||  || — || November 4, 1999 || Socorro || LINEAR || — || align=right | 8.4 km || 
|-id=998 bgcolor=#d6d6d6
| 22998 Waltimyer ||  ||  || November 4, 1999 || Socorro || LINEAR || THM || align=right | 5.9 km || 
|-id=999 bgcolor=#E9E9E9
| 22999 Irizarry ||  ||  || November 5, 1999 || Socorro || LINEAR || — || align=right | 3.3 km || 
|-id=000 bgcolor=#d6d6d6
| 23000 ||  || — || November 7, 1999 || Socorro || LINEAR || — || align=right | 14 km || 
|}

References

External links 
 Discovery Circumstances: Numbered Minor Planets (20001)–(25000) (IAU Minor Planet Center)

0022